

262001–262100 

|-bgcolor=#E9E9E9
| 262001 ||  || — || August 23, 2006 || Palomar || NEAT || — || align=right | 2.1 km || 
|-id=002 bgcolor=#C2FFFF
| 262002 ||  || — || August 23, 2006 || Mauna Kea || D. D. Balam || L4 || align=right | 11 km || 
|-id=003 bgcolor=#E9E9E9
| 262003 ||  || — || August 20, 2006 || Palomar || NEAT || — || align=right | 2.1 km || 
|-id=004 bgcolor=#fefefe
| 262004 ||  || — || August 21, 2006 || Socorro || LINEAR || NYS || align=right data-sort-value="0.69" | 690 m || 
|-id=005 bgcolor=#fefefe
| 262005 ||  || — || August 24, 2006 || Socorro || LINEAR || V || align=right data-sort-value="0.78" | 780 m || 
|-id=006 bgcolor=#E9E9E9
| 262006 ||  || — || August 21, 2006 || Kitt Peak || Spacewatch || — || align=right | 1.2 km || 
|-id=007 bgcolor=#E9E9E9
| 262007 ||  || — || August 22, 2006 || Palomar || NEAT || MAR || align=right | 1.5 km || 
|-id=008 bgcolor=#fefefe
| 262008 ||  || — || August 22, 2006 || Palomar || NEAT || — || align=right | 1.0 km || 
|-id=009 bgcolor=#fefefe
| 262009 ||  || — || August 22, 2006 || Palomar || NEAT || — || align=right | 1.1 km || 
|-id=010 bgcolor=#fefefe
| 262010 ||  || — || August 24, 2006 || Socorro || LINEAR || FLO || align=right | 1.0 km || 
|-id=011 bgcolor=#fefefe
| 262011 ||  || — || August 24, 2006 || Palomar || NEAT || — || align=right data-sort-value="0.92" | 920 m || 
|-id=012 bgcolor=#fefefe
| 262012 ||  || — || August 24, 2006 || Palomar || NEAT || MAS || align=right data-sort-value="0.86" | 860 m || 
|-id=013 bgcolor=#fefefe
| 262013 ||  || — || August 25, 2006 || Socorro || LINEAR || — || align=right data-sort-value="0.99" | 990 m || 
|-id=014 bgcolor=#E9E9E9
| 262014 ||  || — || August 27, 2006 || Kitt Peak || Spacewatch || — || align=right | 1.6 km || 
|-id=015 bgcolor=#E9E9E9
| 262015 ||  || — || August 27, 2006 || Kitt Peak || Spacewatch || — || align=right | 3.0 km || 
|-id=016 bgcolor=#fefefe
| 262016 ||  || — || August 16, 2006 || Palomar || NEAT || FLO || align=right data-sort-value="0.64" | 640 m || 
|-id=017 bgcolor=#fefefe
| 262017 ||  || — || August 16, 2006 || Palomar || NEAT || — || align=right data-sort-value="0.90" | 900 m || 
|-id=018 bgcolor=#fefefe
| 262018 ||  || — || August 22, 2006 || Palomar || NEAT || — || align=right data-sort-value="0.86" | 860 m || 
|-id=019 bgcolor=#fefefe
| 262019 ||  || — || August 22, 2006 || Palomar || NEAT || — || align=right data-sort-value="0.99" | 990 m || 
|-id=020 bgcolor=#fefefe
| 262020 ||  || — || August 23, 2006 || Palomar || NEAT || NYS || align=right data-sort-value="0.82" | 820 m || 
|-id=021 bgcolor=#fefefe
| 262021 ||  || — || August 28, 2006 || Socorro || LINEAR || — || align=right | 1.0 km || 
|-id=022 bgcolor=#fefefe
| 262022 ||  || — || August 28, 2006 || Catalina || CSS || — || align=right data-sort-value="0.89" | 890 m || 
|-id=023 bgcolor=#fefefe
| 262023 ||  || — || August 28, 2006 || Kitt Peak || Spacewatch || FLO || align=right data-sort-value="0.97" | 970 m || 
|-id=024 bgcolor=#fefefe
| 262024 ||  || — || August 28, 2006 || Anderson Mesa || LONEOS || V || align=right data-sort-value="0.95" | 950 m || 
|-id=025 bgcolor=#E9E9E9
| 262025 ||  || — || August 28, 2006 || Lulin Observatory || H.-C. Lin, Q.-z. Ye || — || align=right | 1.6 km || 
|-id=026 bgcolor=#fefefe
| 262026 ||  || — || August 22, 2006 || Palomar || NEAT || — || align=right | 1.2 km || 
|-id=027 bgcolor=#fefefe
| 262027 ||  || — || August 27, 2006 || Anderson Mesa || LONEOS || — || align=right | 1.1 km || 
|-id=028 bgcolor=#fefefe
| 262028 ||  || — || August 29, 2006 || Catalina || CSS || FLO || align=right data-sort-value="0.93" | 930 m || 
|-id=029 bgcolor=#fefefe
| 262029 ||  || — || August 29, 2006 || Catalina || CSS || V || align=right data-sort-value="0.76" | 760 m || 
|-id=030 bgcolor=#E9E9E9
| 262030 ||  || — || August 29, 2006 || Kitt Peak || Spacewatch || — || align=right | 2.1 km || 
|-id=031 bgcolor=#fefefe
| 262031 ||  || — || August 20, 2006 || Palomar || NEAT || — || align=right | 1.0 km || 
|-id=032 bgcolor=#fefefe
| 262032 ||  || — || August 22, 2006 || Palomar || NEAT || ERI || align=right | 2.0 km || 
|-id=033 bgcolor=#fefefe
| 262033 ||  || — || August 23, 2006 || Palomar || NEAT || MAS || align=right data-sort-value="0.71" | 710 m || 
|-id=034 bgcolor=#fefefe
| 262034 ||  || — || August 23, 2006 || Palomar || NEAT || — || align=right | 1.2 km || 
|-id=035 bgcolor=#fefefe
| 262035 ||  || — || August 24, 2006 || Palomar || NEAT || NYS || align=right data-sort-value="0.82" | 820 m || 
|-id=036 bgcolor=#fefefe
| 262036 ||  || — || August 18, 2006 || Palomar || NEAT || — || align=right | 1.1 km || 
|-id=037 bgcolor=#fefefe
| 262037 ||  || — || August 18, 2006 || Palomar || NEAT || V || align=right data-sort-value="0.89" | 890 m || 
|-id=038 bgcolor=#fefefe
| 262038 ||  || — || August 30, 2006 || Socorro || LINEAR || ERI || align=right | 1.8 km || 
|-id=039 bgcolor=#fefefe
| 262039 ||  || — || August 18, 2006 || Kitt Peak || Spacewatch || NYS || align=right data-sort-value="0.73" | 730 m || 
|-id=040 bgcolor=#fefefe
| 262040 ||  || — || August 18, 2006 || Kitt Peak || Spacewatch || NYS || align=right data-sort-value="0.70" | 700 m || 
|-id=041 bgcolor=#fefefe
| 262041 ||  || — || August 19, 2006 || Kitt Peak || Spacewatch || CLA || align=right | 1.8 km || 
|-id=042 bgcolor=#fefefe
| 262042 ||  || — || August 19, 2006 || Kitt Peak || Spacewatch || — || align=right data-sort-value="0.74" | 740 m || 
|-id=043 bgcolor=#fefefe
| 262043 ||  || — || August 19, 2006 || Kitt Peak || Spacewatch || — || align=right data-sort-value="0.93" | 930 m || 
|-id=044 bgcolor=#E9E9E9
| 262044 ||  || — || August 19, 2006 || Kitt Peak || Spacewatch || — || align=right data-sort-value="0.94" | 940 m || 
|-id=045 bgcolor=#fefefe
| 262045 ||  || — || August 29, 2006 || Anderson Mesa || LONEOS || — || align=right | 1.2 km || 
|-id=046 bgcolor=#E9E9E9
| 262046 ||  || — || August 22, 2006 || Cerro Tololo || M. W. Buie || — || align=right | 2.8 km || 
|-id=047 bgcolor=#fefefe
| 262047 ||  || — || August 28, 2006 || Apache Point || A. C. Becker || MAS || align=right data-sort-value="0.65" | 650 m || 
|-id=048 bgcolor=#fefefe
| 262048 ||  || — || August 18, 2006 || Kitt Peak || Spacewatch || — || align=right data-sort-value="0.83" | 830 m || 
|-id=049 bgcolor=#fefefe
| 262049 ||  || — || August 18, 2006 || Kitt Peak || Spacewatch || NYS || align=right data-sort-value="0.58" | 580 m || 
|-id=050 bgcolor=#E9E9E9
| 262050 ||  || — || August 18, 2006 || Kitt Peak || Spacewatch || — || align=right | 2.0 km || 
|-id=051 bgcolor=#E9E9E9
| 262051 ||  || — || September 14, 2006 || Catalina || CSS || — || align=right | 1.2 km || 
|-id=052 bgcolor=#fefefe
| 262052 ||  || — || September 12, 2006 || Catalina || CSS || FLO || align=right data-sort-value="0.87" | 870 m || 
|-id=053 bgcolor=#fefefe
| 262053 ||  || — || September 12, 2006 || Catalina || CSS || FLO || align=right data-sort-value="0.99" | 990 m || 
|-id=054 bgcolor=#fefefe
| 262054 ||  || — || September 12, 2006 || Catalina || CSS || V || align=right data-sort-value="0.79" | 790 m || 
|-id=055 bgcolor=#fefefe
| 262055 ||  || — || September 14, 2006 || Palomar || NEAT || — || align=right | 1.4 km || 
|-id=056 bgcolor=#fefefe
| 262056 ||  || — || September 14, 2006 || Catalina || CSS || EUT || align=right data-sort-value="0.92" | 920 m || 
|-id=057 bgcolor=#fefefe
| 262057 ||  || — || September 15, 2006 || Socorro || LINEAR || — || align=right | 1.2 km || 
|-id=058 bgcolor=#fefefe
| 262058 ||  || — || September 14, 2006 || Catalina || CSS || — || align=right | 1.1 km || 
|-id=059 bgcolor=#fefefe
| 262059 ||  || — || September 15, 2006 || Kitt Peak || Spacewatch || — || align=right data-sort-value="0.97" | 970 m || 
|-id=060 bgcolor=#fefefe
| 262060 ||  || — || September 13, 2006 || Palomar || NEAT || — || align=right data-sort-value="0.91" | 910 m || 
|-id=061 bgcolor=#fefefe
| 262061 ||  || — || September 14, 2006 || Palomar || NEAT || — || align=right data-sort-value="0.92" | 920 m || 
|-id=062 bgcolor=#fefefe
| 262062 ||  || — || September 12, 2006 || Catalina || CSS || NYS || align=right data-sort-value="0.78" | 780 m || 
|-id=063 bgcolor=#fefefe
| 262063 ||  || — || September 14, 2006 || Catalina || CSS || — || align=right data-sort-value="0.95" | 950 m || 
|-id=064 bgcolor=#E9E9E9
| 262064 ||  || — || September 14, 2006 || Kitt Peak || Spacewatch || RAF || align=right | 1.1 km || 
|-id=065 bgcolor=#fefefe
| 262065 ||  || — || September 14, 2006 || Kitt Peak || Spacewatch || NYS || align=right data-sort-value="0.57" | 570 m || 
|-id=066 bgcolor=#E9E9E9
| 262066 ||  || — || September 14, 2006 || Kitt Peak || Spacewatch || — || align=right | 1.1 km || 
|-id=067 bgcolor=#d6d6d6
| 262067 ||  || — || September 14, 2006 || Kitt Peak || Spacewatch || KAR || align=right | 1.2 km || 
|-id=068 bgcolor=#fefefe
| 262068 ||  || — || September 14, 2006 || Palomar || NEAT || V || align=right data-sort-value="0.85" | 850 m || 
|-id=069 bgcolor=#fefefe
| 262069 ||  || — || September 14, 2006 || Kitt Peak || Spacewatch || — || align=right data-sort-value="0.84" | 840 m || 
|-id=070 bgcolor=#fefefe
| 262070 ||  || — || September 14, 2006 || Kitt Peak || Spacewatch || V || align=right data-sort-value="0.87" | 870 m || 
|-id=071 bgcolor=#fefefe
| 262071 ||  || — || September 14, 2006 || Kitt Peak || Spacewatch || NYS || align=right data-sort-value="0.85" | 850 m || 
|-id=072 bgcolor=#E9E9E9
| 262072 ||  || — || September 14, 2006 || Kitt Peak || Spacewatch || HEN || align=right | 1.00 km || 
|-id=073 bgcolor=#d6d6d6
| 262073 ||  || — || September 14, 2006 || Kitt Peak || Spacewatch || KOR || align=right | 1.6 km || 
|-id=074 bgcolor=#E9E9E9
| 262074 ||  || — || September 14, 2006 || Kitt Peak || Spacewatch || — || align=right | 2.4 km || 
|-id=075 bgcolor=#E9E9E9
| 262075 ||  || — || September 14, 2006 || Kitt Peak || Spacewatch || — || align=right | 2.4 km || 
|-id=076 bgcolor=#E9E9E9
| 262076 ||  || — || September 14, 2006 || Kitt Peak || Spacewatch || — || align=right | 1.8 km || 
|-id=077 bgcolor=#fefefe
| 262077 ||  || — || September 12, 2006 || Catalina || CSS || MAS || align=right data-sort-value="0.77" | 770 m || 
|-id=078 bgcolor=#fefefe
| 262078 ||  || — || September 14, 2006 || Catalina || CSS || — || align=right | 1.1 km || 
|-id=079 bgcolor=#fefefe
| 262079 ||  || — || September 12, 2006 || Catalina || CSS || NYS || align=right data-sort-value="0.80" | 800 m || 
|-id=080 bgcolor=#fefefe
| 262080 ||  || — || September 14, 2006 || Palomar || NEAT || CLA || align=right | 1.7 km || 
|-id=081 bgcolor=#fefefe
| 262081 ||  || — || September 14, 2006 || Catalina || CSS || — || align=right data-sort-value="0.98" | 980 m || 
|-id=082 bgcolor=#fefefe
| 262082 ||  || — || September 15, 2006 || Kitt Peak || Spacewatch || — || align=right data-sort-value="0.96" | 960 m || 
|-id=083 bgcolor=#E9E9E9
| 262083 ||  || — || September 15, 2006 || Kitt Peak || Spacewatch || — || align=right | 1.7 km || 
|-id=084 bgcolor=#fefefe
| 262084 ||  || — || September 15, 2006 || Kitt Peak || Spacewatch || MAS || align=right data-sort-value="0.74" | 740 m || 
|-id=085 bgcolor=#fefefe
| 262085 ||  || — || September 15, 2006 || Kitt Peak || Spacewatch || — || align=right data-sort-value="0.85" | 850 m || 
|-id=086 bgcolor=#E9E9E9
| 262086 ||  || — || September 15, 2006 || Kitt Peak || Spacewatch || HEN || align=right | 1.3 km || 
|-id=087 bgcolor=#fefefe
| 262087 ||  || — || September 15, 2006 || Kitt Peak || Spacewatch || — || align=right data-sort-value="0.79" | 790 m || 
|-id=088 bgcolor=#fefefe
| 262088 ||  || — || September 15, 2006 || Kitt Peak || Spacewatch || MAS || align=right data-sort-value="0.72" | 720 m || 
|-id=089 bgcolor=#fefefe
| 262089 ||  || — || September 15, 2006 || Kitt Peak || Spacewatch || V || align=right data-sort-value="0.78" | 780 m || 
|-id=090 bgcolor=#E9E9E9
| 262090 ||  || — || September 15, 2006 || Kitt Peak || Spacewatch || — || align=right | 1.8 km || 
|-id=091 bgcolor=#E9E9E9
| 262091 ||  || — || September 15, 2006 || Kitt Peak || Spacewatch || — || align=right | 2.6 km || 
|-id=092 bgcolor=#E9E9E9
| 262092 ||  || — || September 15, 2006 || Kitt Peak || Spacewatch || — || align=right | 1.5 km || 
|-id=093 bgcolor=#fefefe
| 262093 ||  || — || September 15, 2006 || Kitt Peak || Spacewatch || — || align=right data-sort-value="0.84" | 840 m || 
|-id=094 bgcolor=#E9E9E9
| 262094 ||  || — || September 15, 2006 || Kitt Peak || Spacewatch || — || align=right | 2.3 km || 
|-id=095 bgcolor=#fefefe
| 262095 ||  || — || September 15, 2006 || Kitt Peak || Spacewatch || MAS || align=right data-sort-value="0.93" | 930 m || 
|-id=096 bgcolor=#fefefe
| 262096 ||  || — || September 15, 2006 || Kitt Peak || Spacewatch || NYS || align=right data-sort-value="0.82" | 820 m || 
|-id=097 bgcolor=#fefefe
| 262097 ||  || — || September 15, 2006 || Kitt Peak || Spacewatch || — || align=right | 1.1 km || 
|-id=098 bgcolor=#E9E9E9
| 262098 ||  || — || September 15, 2006 || Kitt Peak || Spacewatch || HEN || align=right | 1.1 km || 
|-id=099 bgcolor=#fefefe
| 262099 ||  || — || September 15, 2006 || Kitt Peak || Spacewatch || — || align=right data-sort-value="0.84" | 840 m || 
|-id=100 bgcolor=#fefefe
| 262100 ||  || — || September 15, 2006 || Kitt Peak || Spacewatch || NYS || align=right data-sort-value="0.74" | 740 m || 
|}

262101–262200 

|-bgcolor=#fefefe
| 262101 ||  || — || September 15, 2006 || Kitt Peak || Spacewatch || — || align=right data-sort-value="0.87" | 870 m || 
|-id=102 bgcolor=#fefefe
| 262102 ||  || — || September 14, 2006 || Palomar || NEAT || ERI || align=right | 3.0 km || 
|-id=103 bgcolor=#E9E9E9
| 262103 ||  || — || September 14, 2006 || Palomar || NEAT || EUN || align=right | 1.3 km || 
|-id=104 bgcolor=#fefefe
| 262104 ||  || — || September 14, 2006 || Catalina || CSS || — || align=right | 1.0 km || 
|-id=105 bgcolor=#fefefe
| 262105 ||  || — || September 15, 2006 || Apache Point || A. C. Becker || — || align=right | 1.4 km || 
|-id=106 bgcolor=#fefefe
| 262106 Margaretryan ||  ||  || September 14, 2006 || Mauna Kea || J. Masiero || MAS || align=right data-sort-value="0.70" | 700 m || 
|-id=107 bgcolor=#E9E9E9
| 262107 ||  || — || September 14, 2006 || Kitt Peak || Spacewatch || — || align=right | 1.6 km || 
|-id=108 bgcolor=#E9E9E9
| 262108 ||  || — || September 15, 2006 || Kitt Peak || Spacewatch || — || align=right | 1.0 km || 
|-id=109 bgcolor=#fefefe
| 262109 ||  || — || September 15, 2006 || Kitt Peak || Spacewatch || — || align=right data-sort-value="0.72" | 720 m || 
|-id=110 bgcolor=#fefefe
| 262110 || 2006 SG || — || September 16, 2006 || Cordell-Lorenz || Cordell–Lorenz Obs. || — || align=right data-sort-value="0.87" | 870 m || 
|-id=111 bgcolor=#E9E9E9
| 262111 ||  || — || September 16, 2006 || Kitt Peak || Spacewatch || — || align=right | 2.5 km || 
|-id=112 bgcolor=#E9E9E9
| 262112 ||  || — || September 16, 2006 || Kitt Peak || Spacewatch || — || align=right | 1.7 km || 
|-id=113 bgcolor=#E9E9E9
| 262113 ||  || — || September 16, 2006 || Catalina || CSS || — || align=right | 3.3 km || 
|-id=114 bgcolor=#fefefe
| 262114 ||  || — || September 16, 2006 || Catalina || CSS || V || align=right data-sort-value="0.94" | 940 m || 
|-id=115 bgcolor=#E9E9E9
| 262115 ||  || — || September 16, 2006 || Anderson Mesa || LONEOS || NEM || align=right | 2.6 km || 
|-id=116 bgcolor=#E9E9E9
| 262116 ||  || — || September 17, 2006 || Catalina || CSS || — || align=right | 1.5 km || 
|-id=117 bgcolor=#E9E9E9
| 262117 ||  || — || September 17, 2006 || Socorro || LINEAR || — || align=right | 2.5 km || 
|-id=118 bgcolor=#fefefe
| 262118 ||  || — || September 17, 2006 || Catalina || CSS || — || align=right data-sort-value="0.91" | 910 m || 
|-id=119 bgcolor=#fefefe
| 262119 ||  || — || September 17, 2006 || Catalina || CSS || — || align=right | 1.0 km || 
|-id=120 bgcolor=#fefefe
| 262120 ||  || — || September 17, 2006 || Kitt Peak || Spacewatch || NYS || align=right data-sort-value="0.85" | 850 m || 
|-id=121 bgcolor=#E9E9E9
| 262121 ||  || — || September 18, 2006 || Kitt Peak || Spacewatch || — || align=right | 2.6 km || 
|-id=122 bgcolor=#fefefe
| 262122 ||  || — || September 16, 2006 || Anderson Mesa || LONEOS || — || align=right data-sort-value="0.89" | 890 m || 
|-id=123 bgcolor=#fefefe
| 262123 ||  || — || September 16, 2006 || Catalina || CSS || V || align=right | 1.0 km || 
|-id=124 bgcolor=#E9E9E9
| 262124 ||  || — || September 16, 2006 || Catalina || CSS || HNS || align=right | 1.6 km || 
|-id=125 bgcolor=#fefefe
| 262125 ||  || — || September 17, 2006 || Kitt Peak || Spacewatch || — || align=right data-sort-value="0.96" | 960 m || 
|-id=126 bgcolor=#fefefe
| 262126 ||  || — || September 17, 2006 || Kitt Peak || Spacewatch || — || align=right data-sort-value="0.89" | 890 m || 
|-id=127 bgcolor=#E9E9E9
| 262127 ||  || — || September 17, 2006 || Kitt Peak || Spacewatch || — || align=right | 1.9 km || 
|-id=128 bgcolor=#fefefe
| 262128 ||  || — || September 17, 2006 || Kitt Peak || Spacewatch || — || align=right data-sort-value="0.96" | 960 m || 
|-id=129 bgcolor=#fefefe
| 262129 ||  || — || September 17, 2006 || Catalina || CSS || V || align=right data-sort-value="0.94" | 940 m || 
|-id=130 bgcolor=#fefefe
| 262130 ||  || — || September 18, 2006 || Catalina || CSS || — || align=right | 1.2 km || 
|-id=131 bgcolor=#E9E9E9
| 262131 ||  || — || September 17, 2006 || Catalina || CSS || EUN || align=right | 1.4 km || 
|-id=132 bgcolor=#E9E9E9
| 262132 ||  || — || September 17, 2006 || Anderson Mesa || LONEOS || — || align=right | 2.0 km || 
|-id=133 bgcolor=#fefefe
| 262133 ||  || — || September 18, 2006 || Catalina || CSS || — || align=right | 1.0 km || 
|-id=134 bgcolor=#fefefe
| 262134 ||  || — || September 18, 2006 || Catalina || CSS || — || align=right | 1.1 km || 
|-id=135 bgcolor=#fefefe
| 262135 ||  || — || September 18, 2006 || Catalina || CSS || FLO || align=right | 1.1 km || 
|-id=136 bgcolor=#fefefe
| 262136 ||  || — || September 18, 2006 || Catalina || CSS || NYS || align=right data-sort-value="0.74" | 740 m || 
|-id=137 bgcolor=#E9E9E9
| 262137 ||  || — || September 18, 2006 || Catalina || CSS || — || align=right | 1.9 km || 
|-id=138 bgcolor=#fefefe
| 262138 ||  || — || September 18, 2006 || Catalina || CSS || — || align=right data-sort-value="0.88" | 880 m || 
|-id=139 bgcolor=#fefefe
| 262139 ||  || — || September 18, 2006 || Catalina || CSS || V || align=right data-sort-value="0.79" | 790 m || 
|-id=140 bgcolor=#fefefe
| 262140 ||  || — || September 19, 2006 || Kitt Peak || Spacewatch || V || align=right data-sort-value="0.96" | 960 m || 
|-id=141 bgcolor=#fefefe
| 262141 ||  || — || September 19, 2006 || Kitt Peak || Spacewatch || — || align=right data-sort-value="0.88" | 880 m || 
|-id=142 bgcolor=#fefefe
| 262142 ||  || — || September 19, 2006 || Kitt Peak || Spacewatch || NYS || align=right data-sort-value="0.92" | 920 m || 
|-id=143 bgcolor=#fefefe
| 262143 ||  || — || September 19, 2006 || Kitt Peak || Spacewatch || MAS || align=right data-sort-value="0.98" | 980 m || 
|-id=144 bgcolor=#fefefe
| 262144 ||  || — || September 19, 2006 || Kitt Peak || Spacewatch || NYS || align=right data-sort-value="0.94" | 940 m || 
|-id=145 bgcolor=#E9E9E9
| 262145 ||  || — || September 19, 2006 || Kitt Peak || Spacewatch || — || align=right | 2.0 km || 
|-id=146 bgcolor=#E9E9E9
| 262146 ||  || — || September 19, 2006 || Kitt Peak || Spacewatch || — || align=right | 1.5 km || 
|-id=147 bgcolor=#fefefe
| 262147 ||  || — || September 19, 2006 || Kitt Peak || Spacewatch || — || align=right data-sort-value="0.90" | 900 m || 
|-id=148 bgcolor=#fefefe
| 262148 ||  || — || September 19, 2006 || Kitt Peak || Spacewatch || NYS || align=right data-sort-value="0.88" | 880 m || 
|-id=149 bgcolor=#fefefe
| 262149 ||  || — || September 19, 2006 || Kitt Peak || Spacewatch || MAS || align=right data-sort-value="0.98" | 980 m || 
|-id=150 bgcolor=#E9E9E9
| 262150 ||  || — || September 19, 2006 || Kitt Peak || Spacewatch || MAR || align=right | 1.2 km || 
|-id=151 bgcolor=#fefefe
| 262151 ||  || — || September 19, 2006 || Kitt Peak || Spacewatch || — || align=right data-sort-value="0.89" | 890 m || 
|-id=152 bgcolor=#E9E9E9
| 262152 ||  || — || September 19, 2006 || Kitt Peak || Spacewatch || — || align=right | 2.8 km || 
|-id=153 bgcolor=#E9E9E9
| 262153 ||  || — || September 18, 2006 || Kitt Peak || Spacewatch || — || align=right | 1.4 km || 
|-id=154 bgcolor=#E9E9E9
| 262154 ||  || — || September 18, 2006 || Kitt Peak || Spacewatch || — || align=right | 1.7 km || 
|-id=155 bgcolor=#fefefe
| 262155 ||  || — || September 18, 2006 || Kitt Peak || Spacewatch || — || align=right data-sort-value="0.98" | 980 m || 
|-id=156 bgcolor=#fefefe
| 262156 ||  || — || September 18, 2006 || Catalina || CSS || FLO || align=right data-sort-value="0.75" | 750 m || 
|-id=157 bgcolor=#E9E9E9
| 262157 ||  || — || September 18, 2006 || Kitt Peak || Spacewatch || — || align=right | 1.5 km || 
|-id=158 bgcolor=#fefefe
| 262158 ||  || — || September 18, 2006 || Kitt Peak || Spacewatch || — || align=right data-sort-value="0.87" | 870 m || 
|-id=159 bgcolor=#fefefe
| 262159 ||  || — || September 18, 2006 || Kitt Peak || Spacewatch || FLO || align=right data-sort-value="0.60" | 600 m || 
|-id=160 bgcolor=#E9E9E9
| 262160 ||  || — || September 18, 2006 || Kitt Peak || Spacewatch || — || align=right | 2.4 km || 
|-id=161 bgcolor=#E9E9E9
| 262161 ||  || — || September 18, 2006 || Kitt Peak || Spacewatch || — || align=right | 2.4 km || 
|-id=162 bgcolor=#fefefe
| 262162 ||  || — || September 18, 2006 || Kitt Peak || Spacewatch || MAS || align=right data-sort-value="0.76" | 760 m || 
|-id=163 bgcolor=#fefefe
| 262163 ||  || — || September 18, 2006 || Kitt Peak || Spacewatch || — || align=right | 1.0 km || 
|-id=164 bgcolor=#fefefe
| 262164 ||  || — || September 18, 2006 || Kitt Peak || Spacewatch || — || align=right data-sort-value="0.81" | 810 m || 
|-id=165 bgcolor=#fefefe
| 262165 ||  || — || September 19, 2006 || Kitt Peak || Spacewatch || NYS || align=right data-sort-value="0.72" | 720 m || 
|-id=166 bgcolor=#fefefe
| 262166 ||  || — || September 19, 2006 || Kitt Peak || Spacewatch || — || align=right data-sort-value="0.97" | 970 m || 
|-id=167 bgcolor=#fefefe
| 262167 ||  || — || September 19, 2006 || Catalina || CSS || — || align=right | 1.1 km || 
|-id=168 bgcolor=#fefefe
| 262168 ||  || — || September 20, 2006 || Kitt Peak || Spacewatch || FLO || align=right data-sort-value="0.79" | 790 m || 
|-id=169 bgcolor=#fefefe
| 262169 ||  || — || September 20, 2006 || Haleakala || NEAT || — || align=right | 1.3 km || 
|-id=170 bgcolor=#E9E9E9
| 262170 ||  || — || September 23, 2006 || Kitt Peak || Spacewatch || — || align=right | 3.1 km || 
|-id=171 bgcolor=#d6d6d6
| 262171 ||  || — || September 23, 2006 || Kitt Peak || Spacewatch || — || align=right | 2.5 km || 
|-id=172 bgcolor=#E9E9E9
| 262172 ||  || — || September 24, 2006 || Kitt Peak || Spacewatch || — || align=right | 1.6 km || 
|-id=173 bgcolor=#fefefe
| 262173 ||  || — || September 24, 2006 || Kitt Peak || Spacewatch || ERI || align=right | 1.7 km || 
|-id=174 bgcolor=#fefefe
| 262174 ||  || — || September 24, 2006 || Kitt Peak || Spacewatch || NYS || align=right data-sort-value="0.79" | 790 m || 
|-id=175 bgcolor=#fefefe
| 262175 ||  || — || September 18, 2006 || Catalina || CSS || — || align=right | 1.1 km || 
|-id=176 bgcolor=#E9E9E9
| 262176 ||  || — || September 18, 2006 || Catalina || CSS || — || align=right | 1.1 km || 
|-id=177 bgcolor=#fefefe
| 262177 ||  || — || September 18, 2006 || Catalina || CSS || FLO || align=right data-sort-value="0.89" | 890 m || 
|-id=178 bgcolor=#fefefe
| 262178 ||  || — || September 18, 2006 || Catalina || CSS || V || align=right data-sort-value="0.87" | 870 m || 
|-id=179 bgcolor=#E9E9E9
| 262179 ||  || — || September 20, 2006 || Palomar || NEAT || — || align=right | 2.1 km || 
|-id=180 bgcolor=#E9E9E9
| 262180 ||  || — || September 16, 2006 || Catalina || CSS || — || align=right | 2.0 km || 
|-id=181 bgcolor=#fefefe
| 262181 ||  || — || September 16, 2006 || Catalina || CSS || V || align=right data-sort-value="0.90" | 900 m || 
|-id=182 bgcolor=#E9E9E9
| 262182 ||  || — || September 20, 2006 || Catalina || CSS || — || align=right | 1.5 km || 
|-id=183 bgcolor=#fefefe
| 262183 ||  || — || September 20, 2006 || Anderson Mesa || LONEOS || V || align=right data-sort-value="0.85" | 850 m || 
|-id=184 bgcolor=#E9E9E9
| 262184 ||  || — || September 22, 2006 || Catalina || CSS || MAR || align=right | 1.6 km || 
|-id=185 bgcolor=#fefefe
| 262185 ||  || — || September 25, 2006 || Anderson Mesa || LONEOS || — || align=right | 1.1 km || 
|-id=186 bgcolor=#fefefe
| 262186 ||  || — || September 26, 2006 || Catalina || CSS || — || align=right data-sort-value="0.95" | 950 m || 
|-id=187 bgcolor=#E9E9E9
| 262187 ||  || — || September 19, 2006 || Kitt Peak || Spacewatch || — || align=right data-sort-value="0.94" | 940 m || 
|-id=188 bgcolor=#fefefe
| 262188 ||  || — || September 19, 2006 || Kitt Peak || Spacewatch || NYS || align=right data-sort-value="0.68" | 680 m || 
|-id=189 bgcolor=#fefefe
| 262189 ||  || — || September 19, 2006 || Kitt Peak || Spacewatch || MAS || align=right data-sort-value="0.74" | 740 m || 
|-id=190 bgcolor=#fefefe
| 262190 ||  || — || September 19, 2006 || Kitt Peak || Spacewatch || — || align=right data-sort-value="0.97" | 970 m || 
|-id=191 bgcolor=#E9E9E9
| 262191 ||  || — || September 19, 2006 || Kitt Peak || Spacewatch || — || align=right | 1.6 km || 
|-id=192 bgcolor=#fefefe
| 262192 ||  || — || September 19, 2006 || Kitt Peak || Spacewatch || — || align=right | 1.1 km || 
|-id=193 bgcolor=#E9E9E9
| 262193 ||  || — || September 22, 2006 || Catalina || CSS || — || align=right | 4.1 km || 
|-id=194 bgcolor=#fefefe
| 262194 ||  || — || September 23, 2006 || Kitt Peak || Spacewatch || MAS || align=right data-sort-value="0.80" | 800 m || 
|-id=195 bgcolor=#fefefe
| 262195 ||  || — || September 25, 2006 || Kitt Peak || Spacewatch || — || align=right | 1.1 km || 
|-id=196 bgcolor=#E9E9E9
| 262196 ||  || — || September 25, 2006 || Kitt Peak || Spacewatch || — || align=right | 1.1 km || 
|-id=197 bgcolor=#fefefe
| 262197 ||  || — || September 25, 2006 || Kitt Peak || Spacewatch || — || align=right data-sort-value="0.95" | 950 m || 
|-id=198 bgcolor=#fefefe
| 262198 ||  || — || September 25, 2006 || Kitt Peak || Spacewatch || — || align=right data-sort-value="0.74" | 740 m || 
|-id=199 bgcolor=#fefefe
| 262199 ||  || — || September 25, 2006 || Kitt Peak || Spacewatch || — || align=right data-sort-value="0.95" | 950 m || 
|-id=200 bgcolor=#E9E9E9
| 262200 ||  || — || September 25, 2006 || Kitt Peak || Spacewatch || — || align=right data-sort-value="0.53" | 530 m || 
|}

262201–262300 

|-bgcolor=#fefefe
| 262201 ||  || — || September 25, 2006 || Kitt Peak || Spacewatch || V || align=right data-sort-value="0.85" | 850 m || 
|-id=202 bgcolor=#fefefe
| 262202 ||  || — || September 26, 2006 || Kitt Peak || Spacewatch || V || align=right data-sort-value="0.80" | 800 m || 
|-id=203 bgcolor=#d6d6d6
| 262203 ||  || — || September 26, 2006 || Mount Lemmon || Mount Lemmon Survey || — || align=right | 3.8 km || 
|-id=204 bgcolor=#E9E9E9
| 262204 ||  || — || September 25, 2006 || Anderson Mesa || LONEOS || — || align=right | 3.3 km || 
|-id=205 bgcolor=#fefefe
| 262205 ||  || — || September 25, 2006 || Anderson Mesa || LONEOS || NYS || align=right data-sort-value="0.76" | 760 m || 
|-id=206 bgcolor=#E9E9E9
| 262206 ||  || — || September 25, 2006 || Mount Lemmon || Mount Lemmon Survey || — || align=right | 1.9 km || 
|-id=207 bgcolor=#fefefe
| 262207 ||  || — || September 26, 2006 || Socorro || LINEAR || — || align=right data-sort-value="0.89" | 890 m || 
|-id=208 bgcolor=#fefefe
| 262208 ||  || — || September 26, 2006 || Mount Lemmon || Mount Lemmon Survey || MAS || align=right data-sort-value="0.70" | 700 m || 
|-id=209 bgcolor=#E9E9E9
| 262209 ||  || — || September 26, 2006 || Kitt Peak || Spacewatch || — || align=right | 1.4 km || 
|-id=210 bgcolor=#E9E9E9
| 262210 ||  || — || September 27, 2006 || Kitt Peak || Spacewatch || — || align=right | 1.0 km || 
|-id=211 bgcolor=#fefefe
| 262211 ||  || — || September 28, 2006 || Kitt Peak || Spacewatch || NYS || align=right data-sort-value="0.77" | 770 m || 
|-id=212 bgcolor=#fefefe
| 262212 ||  || — || September 25, 2006 || Mount Lemmon || Mount Lemmon Survey || NYS || align=right data-sort-value="0.61" | 610 m || 
|-id=213 bgcolor=#fefefe
| 262213 ||  || — || September 25, 2006 || Mount Lemmon || Mount Lemmon Survey || MAS || align=right data-sort-value="0.80" | 800 m || 
|-id=214 bgcolor=#fefefe
| 262214 ||  || — || September 25, 2006 || Mount Lemmon || Mount Lemmon Survey || — || align=right | 1.0 km || 
|-id=215 bgcolor=#E9E9E9
| 262215 ||  || — || September 26, 2006 || Kitt Peak || Spacewatch || — || align=right | 1.8 km || 
|-id=216 bgcolor=#fefefe
| 262216 ||  || — || September 26, 2006 || Kitt Peak || Spacewatch || NYS || align=right data-sort-value="0.58" | 580 m || 
|-id=217 bgcolor=#E9E9E9
| 262217 ||  || — || September 26, 2006 || Socorro || LINEAR || — || align=right | 1.9 km || 
|-id=218 bgcolor=#E9E9E9
| 262218 ||  || — || September 26, 2006 || Kitt Peak || Spacewatch || HOF || align=right | 2.7 km || 
|-id=219 bgcolor=#E9E9E9
| 262219 ||  || — || September 26, 2006 || Kitt Peak || Spacewatch || AGN || align=right | 1.4 km || 
|-id=220 bgcolor=#d6d6d6
| 262220 ||  || — || September 26, 2006 || Kitt Peak || Spacewatch || — || align=right | 2.8 km || 
|-id=221 bgcolor=#E9E9E9
| 262221 ||  || — || September 26, 2006 || Kitt Peak || Spacewatch || — || align=right | 1.3 km || 
|-id=222 bgcolor=#fefefe
| 262222 ||  || — || September 26, 2006 || Kitt Peak || Spacewatch || — || align=right data-sort-value="0.90" | 900 m || 
|-id=223 bgcolor=#fefefe
| 262223 ||  || — || September 26, 2006 || Kitt Peak || Spacewatch || — || align=right | 1.0 km || 
|-id=224 bgcolor=#E9E9E9
| 262224 ||  || — || September 26, 2006 || Kitt Peak || Spacewatch || NEM || align=right | 2.9 km || 
|-id=225 bgcolor=#E9E9E9
| 262225 ||  || — || September 26, 2006 || Kitt Peak || Spacewatch || WIT || align=right | 1.5 km || 
|-id=226 bgcolor=#E9E9E9
| 262226 ||  || — || September 27, 2006 || Anderson Mesa || LONEOS || — || align=right | 1.9 km || 
|-id=227 bgcolor=#E9E9E9
| 262227 ||  || — || September 27, 2006 || Mount Lemmon || Mount Lemmon Survey || — || align=right | 1.0 km || 
|-id=228 bgcolor=#E9E9E9
| 262228 ||  || — || September 29, 2006 || Anderson Mesa || LONEOS || MRX || align=right | 1.5 km || 
|-id=229 bgcolor=#fefefe
| 262229 ||  || — || September 29, 2006 || Anderson Mesa || LONEOS || NYS || align=right data-sort-value="0.94" | 940 m || 
|-id=230 bgcolor=#fefefe
| 262230 ||  || — || September 29, 2006 || Anderson Mesa || LONEOS || NYS || align=right data-sort-value="0.95" | 950 m || 
|-id=231 bgcolor=#E9E9E9
| 262231 ||  || — || September 25, 2006 || Anderson Mesa || LONEOS || — || align=right | 2.0 km || 
|-id=232 bgcolor=#E9E9E9
| 262232 ||  || — || September 26, 2006 || Socorro || LINEAR || — || align=right | 2.5 km || 
|-id=233 bgcolor=#fefefe
| 262233 ||  || — || September 26, 2006 || Catalina || CSS || — || align=right | 1.1 km || 
|-id=234 bgcolor=#E9E9E9
| 262234 ||  || — || September 27, 2006 || Anderson Mesa || LONEOS || — || align=right | 2.9 km || 
|-id=235 bgcolor=#fefefe
| 262235 ||  || — || September 28, 2006 || Socorro || LINEAR || V || align=right data-sort-value="0.74" | 740 m || 
|-id=236 bgcolor=#fefefe
| 262236 ||  || — || September 28, 2006 || Catalina || CSS || — || align=right | 1.3 km || 
|-id=237 bgcolor=#E9E9E9
| 262237 ||  || — || September 18, 2006 || Catalina || CSS || — || align=right | 3.3 km || 
|-id=238 bgcolor=#E9E9E9
| 262238 ||  || — || September 22, 2006 || San Marcello || Pistoia Mountains Obs. || — || align=right | 2.3 km || 
|-id=239 bgcolor=#E9E9E9
| 262239 ||  || — || September 22, 2006 || Socorro || LINEAR || JUN || align=right | 1.2 km || 
|-id=240 bgcolor=#fefefe
| 262240 ||  || — || September 22, 2006 || Catalina || CSS || — || align=right data-sort-value="0.79" | 790 m || 
|-id=241 bgcolor=#fefefe
| 262241 ||  || — || September 26, 2006 || Catalina || CSS || — || align=right | 1.0 km || 
|-id=242 bgcolor=#E9E9E9
| 262242 ||  || — || September 26, 2006 || Catalina || CSS || — || align=right | 2.7 km || 
|-id=243 bgcolor=#E9E9E9
| 262243 ||  || — || September 25, 2006 || Kitt Peak || Spacewatch || XIZ || align=right | 1.4 km || 
|-id=244 bgcolor=#E9E9E9
| 262244 ||  || — || September 25, 2006 || Kitt Peak || Spacewatch || — || align=right | 1.9 km || 
|-id=245 bgcolor=#fefefe
| 262245 ||  || — || September 26, 2006 || Kitt Peak || Spacewatch || FLO || align=right data-sort-value="0.67" | 670 m || 
|-id=246 bgcolor=#fefefe
| 262246 ||  || — || September 26, 2006 || Mount Lemmon || Mount Lemmon Survey || FLO || align=right data-sort-value="0.94" | 940 m || 
|-id=247 bgcolor=#E9E9E9
| 262247 ||  || — || September 27, 2006 || Kitt Peak || Spacewatch || — || align=right | 2.7 km || 
|-id=248 bgcolor=#fefefe
| 262248 ||  || — || September 27, 2006 || Catalina || CSS || V || align=right | 1.1 km || 
|-id=249 bgcolor=#E9E9E9
| 262249 ||  || — || September 27, 2006 || Kitt Peak || Spacewatch || — || align=right | 1.7 km || 
|-id=250 bgcolor=#E9E9E9
| 262250 ||  || — || September 27, 2006 || Mount Lemmon || Mount Lemmon Survey || AGN || align=right | 1.4 km || 
|-id=251 bgcolor=#E9E9E9
| 262251 ||  || — || September 27, 2006 || Kitt Peak || Spacewatch || — || align=right | 1.6 km || 
|-id=252 bgcolor=#E9E9E9
| 262252 ||  || — || September 27, 2006 || Kitt Peak || Spacewatch || — || align=right | 1.1 km || 
|-id=253 bgcolor=#E9E9E9
| 262253 ||  || — || September 27, 2006 || Kitt Peak || Spacewatch || MIS || align=right | 2.3 km || 
|-id=254 bgcolor=#E9E9E9
| 262254 ||  || — || September 27, 2006 || Kitt Peak || Spacewatch || AGN || align=right | 1.4 km || 
|-id=255 bgcolor=#E9E9E9
| 262255 ||  || — || September 27, 2006 || Kitt Peak || Spacewatch || — || align=right | 3.0 km || 
|-id=256 bgcolor=#fefefe
| 262256 ||  || — || September 27, 2006 || Kitt Peak || Spacewatch || NYS || align=right data-sort-value="0.83" | 830 m || 
|-id=257 bgcolor=#fefefe
| 262257 ||  || — || September 27, 2006 || Kitt Peak || Spacewatch || — || align=right data-sort-value="0.92" | 920 m || 
|-id=258 bgcolor=#fefefe
| 262258 ||  || — || September 27, 2006 || Kitt Peak || Spacewatch || — || align=right data-sort-value="0.72" | 720 m || 
|-id=259 bgcolor=#fefefe
| 262259 ||  || — || September 27, 2006 || Kitt Peak || Spacewatch || NYS || align=right data-sort-value="0.75" | 750 m || 
|-id=260 bgcolor=#E9E9E9
| 262260 ||  || — || September 27, 2006 || Kitt Peak || Spacewatch || — || align=right | 2.6 km || 
|-id=261 bgcolor=#fefefe
| 262261 ||  || — || September 27, 2006 || Kitt Peak || Spacewatch || — || align=right | 1.2 km || 
|-id=262 bgcolor=#E9E9E9
| 262262 ||  || — || September 28, 2006 || Kitt Peak || Spacewatch || — || align=right | 1.2 km || 
|-id=263 bgcolor=#fefefe
| 262263 ||  || — || September 28, 2006 || Kitt Peak || Spacewatch || NYS || align=right data-sort-value="0.59" | 590 m || 
|-id=264 bgcolor=#fefefe
| 262264 ||  || — || September 28, 2006 || Kitt Peak || Spacewatch || SUL || align=right | 2.6 km || 
|-id=265 bgcolor=#E9E9E9
| 262265 ||  || — || September 28, 2006 || Kitt Peak || Spacewatch || — || align=right | 3.2 km || 
|-id=266 bgcolor=#fefefe
| 262266 ||  || — || September 28, 2006 || Kitt Peak || Spacewatch || NYS || align=right data-sort-value="0.68" | 680 m || 
|-id=267 bgcolor=#d6d6d6
| 262267 ||  || — || September 28, 2006 || Kitt Peak || Spacewatch || K-2 || align=right | 1.5 km || 
|-id=268 bgcolor=#fefefe
| 262268 ||  || — || September 28, 2006 || Kitt Peak || Spacewatch || — || align=right data-sort-value="0.78" | 780 m || 
|-id=269 bgcolor=#fefefe
| 262269 ||  || — || September 28, 2006 || Kitt Peak || Spacewatch || — || align=right data-sort-value="0.92" | 920 m || 
|-id=270 bgcolor=#E9E9E9
| 262270 ||  || — || September 30, 2006 || Catalina || CSS || HNA || align=right | 3.9 km || 
|-id=271 bgcolor=#fefefe
| 262271 ||  || — || September 30, 2006 || Catalina || CSS || — || align=right | 1.3 km || 
|-id=272 bgcolor=#E9E9E9
| 262272 ||  || — || September 30, 2006 || Catalina || CSS || — || align=right | 1.8 km || 
|-id=273 bgcolor=#fefefe
| 262273 ||  || — || September 30, 2006 || Catalina || CSS || NYS || align=right data-sort-value="0.78" | 780 m || 
|-id=274 bgcolor=#fefefe
| 262274 ||  || — || September 30, 2006 || Catalina || CSS || — || align=right | 1.2 km || 
|-id=275 bgcolor=#fefefe
| 262275 ||  || — || September 30, 2006 || Catalina || CSS || — || align=right | 1.1 km || 
|-id=276 bgcolor=#E9E9E9
| 262276 ||  || — || September 30, 2006 || Catalina || CSS || HEN || align=right | 1.2 km || 
|-id=277 bgcolor=#E9E9E9
| 262277 ||  || — || September 30, 2006 || Mount Lemmon || Mount Lemmon Survey || — || align=right | 1.3 km || 
|-id=278 bgcolor=#d6d6d6
| 262278 ||  || — || September 30, 2006 || Mount Lemmon || Mount Lemmon Survey || K-2 || align=right | 1.5 km || 
|-id=279 bgcolor=#E9E9E9
| 262279 ||  || — || September 30, 2006 || Mount Lemmon || Mount Lemmon Survey || — || align=right | 2.5 km || 
|-id=280 bgcolor=#E9E9E9
| 262280 ||  || — || September 30, 2006 || Mount Lemmon || Mount Lemmon Survey || — || align=right | 2.9 km || 
|-id=281 bgcolor=#E9E9E9
| 262281 ||  || — || September 30, 2006 || Mount Lemmon || Mount Lemmon Survey || — || align=right | 2.9 km || 
|-id=282 bgcolor=#E9E9E9
| 262282 ||  || — || September 30, 2006 || Catalina || CSS || PAD || align=right | 1.9 km || 
|-id=283 bgcolor=#fefefe
| 262283 ||  || — || September 25, 2006 || Catalina || CSS || — || align=right | 3.2 km || 
|-id=284 bgcolor=#E9E9E9
| 262284 ||  || — || September 24, 2006 || Moletai || Molėtai Obs. || GEF || align=right | 1.7 km || 
|-id=285 bgcolor=#fefefe
| 262285 ||  || — || September 16, 2006 || Apache Point || A. C. Becker || — || align=right | 1.1 km || 
|-id=286 bgcolor=#fefefe
| 262286 ||  || — || September 17, 2006 || Apache Point || A. C. Becker || — || align=right data-sort-value="0.95" | 950 m || 
|-id=287 bgcolor=#E9E9E9
| 262287 ||  || — || September 18, 2006 || Apache Point || A. C. Becker || — || align=right | 2.6 km || 
|-id=288 bgcolor=#E9E9E9
| 262288 ||  || — || September 17, 2006 || Kitt Peak || Spacewatch || — || align=right | 1.8 km || 
|-id=289 bgcolor=#E9E9E9
| 262289 ||  || — || September 18, 2006 || Kitt Peak || Spacewatch || — || align=right | 2.3 km || 
|-id=290 bgcolor=#E9E9E9
| 262290 ||  || — || September 19, 2006 || Kitt Peak || Spacewatch || — || align=right | 2.5 km || 
|-id=291 bgcolor=#fefefe
| 262291 ||  || — || September 27, 2006 || Mount Lemmon || Mount Lemmon Survey || — || align=right | 1.3 km || 
|-id=292 bgcolor=#fefefe
| 262292 ||  || — || September 30, 2006 || Kitt Peak || Spacewatch || — || align=right data-sort-value="0.98" | 980 m || 
|-id=293 bgcolor=#E9E9E9
| 262293 ||  || — || September 30, 2006 || Mount Lemmon || Mount Lemmon Survey || — || align=right | 2.0 km || 
|-id=294 bgcolor=#E9E9E9
| 262294 ||  || — || September 30, 2006 || Kitt Peak || Spacewatch || — || align=right | 3.4 km || 
|-id=295 bgcolor=#fefefe
| 262295 Jeffrich ||  ||  || September 17, 2006 || Mauna Kea || J. Masiero || MAS || align=right data-sort-value="0.64" | 640 m || 
|-id=296 bgcolor=#E9E9E9
| 262296 ||  || — || September 30, 2006 || Mount Lemmon || Mount Lemmon Survey || ADE || align=right | 2.3 km || 
|-id=297 bgcolor=#fefefe
| 262297 ||  || — || September 30, 2006 || Mount Lemmon || Mount Lemmon Survey || — || align=right | 1.1 km || 
|-id=298 bgcolor=#E9E9E9
| 262298 ||  || — || September 16, 2006 || Anderson Mesa || LONEOS || — || align=right | 1.5 km || 
|-id=299 bgcolor=#d6d6d6
| 262299 ||  || — || September 27, 2006 || Mount Lemmon || Mount Lemmon Survey || KOR || align=right | 1.4 km || 
|-id=300 bgcolor=#E9E9E9
| 262300 ||  || — || September 18, 2006 || Catalina || CSS || — || align=right | 2.7 km || 
|}

262301–262400 

|-bgcolor=#fefefe
| 262301 ||  || — || September 19, 2006 || Catalina || CSS || — || align=right | 1.3 km || 
|-id=302 bgcolor=#E9E9E9
| 262302 || 2006 TY || — || October 1, 2006 || Great Shefford || P. Birtwhistle || ADE || align=right | 2.2 km || 
|-id=303 bgcolor=#fefefe
| 262303 ||  || — || October 2, 2006 || Catalina || CSS || V || align=right data-sort-value="0.91" | 910 m || 
|-id=304 bgcolor=#fefefe
| 262304 ||  || — || October 2, 2006 || Mount Lemmon || Mount Lemmon Survey || V || align=right data-sort-value="0.79" | 790 m || 
|-id=305 bgcolor=#fefefe
| 262305 ||  || — || October 3, 2006 || Mount Lemmon || Mount Lemmon Survey || — || align=right | 1.2 km || 
|-id=306 bgcolor=#E9E9E9
| 262306 ||  || — || October 11, 2006 || Kitt Peak || Spacewatch || — || align=right | 1.7 km || 
|-id=307 bgcolor=#E9E9E9
| 262307 ||  || — || October 15, 2006 || Herrenberg || Herrenberg Obs. || — || align=right | 4.4 km || 
|-id=308 bgcolor=#E9E9E9
| 262308 ||  || — || October 13, 2006 || Kitt Peak || Spacewatch || MRX || align=right | 1.3 km || 
|-id=309 bgcolor=#fefefe
| 262309 ||  || — || October 10, 2006 || Palomar || NEAT || — || align=right | 1.4 km || 
|-id=310 bgcolor=#fefefe
| 262310 ||  || — || October 10, 2006 || Palomar || NEAT || — || align=right data-sort-value="0.97" | 970 m || 
|-id=311 bgcolor=#E9E9E9
| 262311 ||  || — || October 10, 2006 || Palomar || NEAT || — || align=right | 1.4 km || 
|-id=312 bgcolor=#fefefe
| 262312 ||  || — || October 10, 2006 || Palomar || NEAT || NYS || align=right data-sort-value="0.92" | 920 m || 
|-id=313 bgcolor=#E9E9E9
| 262313 ||  || — || October 10, 2006 || Palomar || NEAT || — || align=right | 2.9 km || 
|-id=314 bgcolor=#E9E9E9
| 262314 ||  || — || October 11, 2006 || Kitt Peak || Spacewatch || HOF || align=right | 4.1 km || 
|-id=315 bgcolor=#fefefe
| 262315 ||  || — || October 11, 2006 || Kitt Peak || Spacewatch || — || align=right | 1.3 km || 
|-id=316 bgcolor=#E9E9E9
| 262316 ||  || — || October 11, 2006 || Kitt Peak || Spacewatch || — || align=right | 2.9 km || 
|-id=317 bgcolor=#fefefe
| 262317 ||  || — || October 11, 2006 || Kitt Peak || Spacewatch || V || align=right data-sort-value="0.93" | 930 m || 
|-id=318 bgcolor=#E9E9E9
| 262318 ||  || — || October 11, 2006 || Kitt Peak || Spacewatch || AGN || align=right | 1.3 km || 
|-id=319 bgcolor=#E9E9E9
| 262319 ||  || — || October 12, 2006 || Kitt Peak || Spacewatch || — || align=right | 1.4 km || 
|-id=320 bgcolor=#fefefe
| 262320 ||  || — || October 12, 2006 || Kitt Peak || Spacewatch || V || align=right data-sort-value="0.75" | 750 m || 
|-id=321 bgcolor=#fefefe
| 262321 ||  || — || October 12, 2006 || Kitt Peak || Spacewatch || NYS || align=right data-sort-value="0.86" | 860 m || 
|-id=322 bgcolor=#E9E9E9
| 262322 ||  || — || October 12, 2006 || Kitt Peak || Spacewatch || — || align=right | 2.3 km || 
|-id=323 bgcolor=#E9E9E9
| 262323 ||  || — || October 12, 2006 || Kitt Peak || Spacewatch || — || align=right | 3.5 km || 
|-id=324 bgcolor=#d6d6d6
| 262324 ||  || — || October 12, 2006 || Kitt Peak || Spacewatch || KOR || align=right | 1.5 km || 
|-id=325 bgcolor=#fefefe
| 262325 ||  || — || October 12, 2006 || Kitt Peak || Spacewatch || — || align=right | 1.2 km || 
|-id=326 bgcolor=#d6d6d6
| 262326 ||  || — || October 12, 2006 || Kitt Peak || Spacewatch || KOR || align=right | 1.5 km || 
|-id=327 bgcolor=#E9E9E9
| 262327 ||  || — || October 12, 2006 || Kitt Peak || Spacewatch || — || align=right | 3.2 km || 
|-id=328 bgcolor=#E9E9E9
| 262328 ||  || — || October 12, 2006 || Kitt Peak || Spacewatch || — || align=right | 2.3 km || 
|-id=329 bgcolor=#E9E9E9
| 262329 ||  || — || October 12, 2006 || Kitt Peak || Spacewatch || NEM || align=right | 2.7 km || 
|-id=330 bgcolor=#fefefe
| 262330 ||  || — || October 12, 2006 || Kitt Peak || Spacewatch || NYS || align=right data-sort-value="0.87" | 870 m || 
|-id=331 bgcolor=#E9E9E9
| 262331 ||  || — || October 12, 2006 || Kitt Peak || Spacewatch || MAR || align=right | 1.2 km || 
|-id=332 bgcolor=#E9E9E9
| 262332 ||  || — || October 12, 2006 || Kitt Peak || Spacewatch || — || align=right | 1.2 km || 
|-id=333 bgcolor=#E9E9E9
| 262333 ||  || — || October 12, 2006 || Kitt Peak || Spacewatch || — || align=right | 1.8 km || 
|-id=334 bgcolor=#d6d6d6
| 262334 ||  || — || October 12, 2006 || Kitt Peak || Spacewatch || CHA || align=right | 2.5 km || 
|-id=335 bgcolor=#fefefe
| 262335 ||  || — || October 12, 2006 || Kitt Peak || Spacewatch || — || align=right | 1.1 km || 
|-id=336 bgcolor=#E9E9E9
| 262336 ||  || — || October 12, 2006 || Kitt Peak || Spacewatch || — || align=right | 2.1 km || 
|-id=337 bgcolor=#E9E9E9
| 262337 ||  || — || October 12, 2006 || Kitt Peak || Spacewatch || — || align=right | 1.7 km || 
|-id=338 bgcolor=#E9E9E9
| 262338 ||  || — || October 12, 2006 || Kitt Peak || Spacewatch || — || align=right | 1.8 km || 
|-id=339 bgcolor=#E9E9E9
| 262339 ||  || — || October 12, 2006 || Kitt Peak || Spacewatch || — || align=right | 1.3 km || 
|-id=340 bgcolor=#fefefe
| 262340 ||  || — || October 12, 2006 || Palomar || NEAT || MAS || align=right data-sort-value="0.93" | 930 m || 
|-id=341 bgcolor=#fefefe
| 262341 ||  || — || October 12, 2006 || Kitt Peak || Spacewatch || MAS || align=right data-sort-value="0.97" | 970 m || 
|-id=342 bgcolor=#E9E9E9
| 262342 ||  || — || October 12, 2006 || Kitt Peak || Spacewatch || — || align=right | 1.4 km || 
|-id=343 bgcolor=#fefefe
| 262343 ||  || — || October 12, 2006 || Palomar || NEAT || FLO || align=right data-sort-value="0.98" | 980 m || 
|-id=344 bgcolor=#E9E9E9
| 262344 ||  || — || October 15, 2006 || Lulin Observatory || C.-S. Lin, Q.-z. Ye || NEM || align=right | 3.1 km || 
|-id=345 bgcolor=#E9E9E9
| 262345 ||  || — || October 9, 2006 || Palomar || NEAT || — || align=right | 3.6 km || 
|-id=346 bgcolor=#E9E9E9
| 262346 ||  || — || October 9, 2006 || Palomar || NEAT || — || align=right | 2.8 km || 
|-id=347 bgcolor=#fefefe
| 262347 ||  || — || October 10, 2006 || Palomar || NEAT || — || align=right | 1.1 km || 
|-id=348 bgcolor=#E9E9E9
| 262348 ||  || — || October 10, 2006 || Palomar || NEAT || GER || align=right | 1.6 km || 
|-id=349 bgcolor=#fefefe
| 262349 ||  || — || October 11, 2006 || Palomar || NEAT || — || align=right | 1.2 km || 
|-id=350 bgcolor=#E9E9E9
| 262350 ||  || — || October 11, 2006 || Kitt Peak || Spacewatch || — || align=right | 2.4 km || 
|-id=351 bgcolor=#E9E9E9
| 262351 ||  || — || October 11, 2006 || Palomar || NEAT || — || align=right | 1.5 km || 
|-id=352 bgcolor=#E9E9E9
| 262352 ||  || — || October 11, 2006 || Palomar || NEAT || — || align=right | 1.8 km || 
|-id=353 bgcolor=#fefefe
| 262353 ||  || — || October 11, 2006 || Palomar || NEAT || NYS || align=right data-sort-value="0.96" | 960 m || 
|-id=354 bgcolor=#fefefe
| 262354 ||  || — || October 11, 2006 || Palomar || NEAT || — || align=right | 1.4 km || 
|-id=355 bgcolor=#fefefe
| 262355 ||  || — || October 11, 2006 || Palomar || NEAT || NYS || align=right | 1.0 km || 
|-id=356 bgcolor=#E9E9E9
| 262356 ||  || — || October 11, 2006 || Palomar || NEAT || MAR || align=right | 1.3 km || 
|-id=357 bgcolor=#E9E9E9
| 262357 ||  || — || October 11, 2006 || Palomar || NEAT || — || align=right | 2.1 km || 
|-id=358 bgcolor=#fefefe
| 262358 ||  || — || October 13, 2006 || Kitt Peak || Spacewatch || — || align=right data-sort-value="0.98" | 980 m || 
|-id=359 bgcolor=#fefefe
| 262359 ||  || — || October 13, 2006 || Kitt Peak || Spacewatch || — || align=right data-sort-value="0.93" | 930 m || 
|-id=360 bgcolor=#E9E9E9
| 262360 ||  || — || October 13, 2006 || Kitt Peak || Spacewatch || — || align=right | 2.2 km || 
|-id=361 bgcolor=#d6d6d6
| 262361 ||  || — || October 13, 2006 || Kitt Peak || Spacewatch || — || align=right | 4.5 km || 
|-id=362 bgcolor=#E9E9E9
| 262362 ||  || — || October 13, 2006 || Kitt Peak || Spacewatch || WIT || align=right | 1.3 km || 
|-id=363 bgcolor=#E9E9E9
| 262363 ||  || — || October 13, 2006 || Kitt Peak || Spacewatch || — || align=right | 1.3 km || 
|-id=364 bgcolor=#E9E9E9
| 262364 ||  || — || October 13, 2006 || Kitt Peak || Spacewatch || — || align=right | 1.5 km || 
|-id=365 bgcolor=#fefefe
| 262365 ||  || — || October 13, 2006 || Kitt Peak || Spacewatch || NYS || align=right data-sort-value="0.70" | 700 m || 
|-id=366 bgcolor=#fefefe
| 262366 ||  || — || October 13, 2006 || Kitt Peak || Spacewatch || — || align=right | 1.2 km || 
|-id=367 bgcolor=#E9E9E9
| 262367 ||  || — || October 13, 2006 || Kitt Peak || Spacewatch || — || align=right | 2.4 km || 
|-id=368 bgcolor=#fefefe
| 262368 ||  || — || October 13, 2006 || Kitt Peak || Spacewatch || NYS || align=right data-sort-value="0.82" | 820 m || 
|-id=369 bgcolor=#E9E9E9
| 262369 ||  || — || October 15, 2006 || Kitt Peak || Spacewatch || — || align=right | 1.9 km || 
|-id=370 bgcolor=#fefefe
| 262370 ||  || — || October 15, 2006 || Lulin || C.-S. Lin, Q.-z. Ye || NYS || align=right data-sort-value="0.68" | 680 m || 
|-id=371 bgcolor=#fefefe
| 262371 ||  || — || October 15, 2006 || Kitt Peak || Spacewatch || — || align=right data-sort-value="0.88" | 880 m || 
|-id=372 bgcolor=#fefefe
| 262372 ||  || — || October 15, 2006 || Kitt Peak || Spacewatch || — || align=right | 1.1 km || 
|-id=373 bgcolor=#E9E9E9
| 262373 ||  || — || October 15, 2006 || Kitt Peak || Spacewatch || — || align=right | 1.8 km || 
|-id=374 bgcolor=#E9E9E9
| 262374 ||  || — || October 15, 2006 || Kitt Peak || Spacewatch || — || align=right data-sort-value="0.94" | 940 m || 
|-id=375 bgcolor=#E9E9E9
| 262375 ||  || — || October 15, 2006 || Kitt Peak || Spacewatch || — || align=right | 1.3 km || 
|-id=376 bgcolor=#E9E9E9
| 262376 ||  || — || October 15, 2006 || Kitt Peak || Spacewatch || — || align=right | 1.8 km || 
|-id=377 bgcolor=#fefefe
| 262377 ||  || — || October 15, 2006 || Kitt Peak || Spacewatch || NYS || align=right data-sort-value="0.76" | 760 m || 
|-id=378 bgcolor=#fefefe
| 262378 ||  || — || October 3, 2006 || Mount Lemmon || Mount Lemmon Survey || NYS || align=right data-sort-value="0.85" | 850 m || 
|-id=379 bgcolor=#fefefe
| 262379 ||  || — || October 13, 2006 || Kitt Peak || Spacewatch || NYS || align=right data-sort-value="0.81" | 810 m || 
|-id=380 bgcolor=#fefefe
| 262380 ||  || — || October 1, 2006 || Apache Point || A. C. Becker || — || align=right data-sort-value="0.83" | 830 m || 
|-id=381 bgcolor=#E9E9E9
| 262381 ||  || — || October 1, 2006 || Apache Point || A. C. Becker || — || align=right | 2.9 km || 
|-id=382 bgcolor=#d6d6d6
| 262382 ||  || — || October 2, 2006 || Mount Lemmon || Mount Lemmon Survey || EOS || align=right | 2.8 km || 
|-id=383 bgcolor=#fefefe
| 262383 ||  || — || October 3, 2006 || Mount Lemmon || Mount Lemmon Survey || — || align=right | 1.1 km || 
|-id=384 bgcolor=#E9E9E9
| 262384 ||  || — || October 12, 2006 || Palomar || NEAT || — || align=right | 2.3 km || 
|-id=385 bgcolor=#fefefe
| 262385 || 2006 UT || — || October 16, 2006 || Altschwendt || W. Ries || — || align=right | 1.1 km || 
|-id=386 bgcolor=#E9E9E9
| 262386 ||  || — || October 17, 2006 || Altschwendt || W. Ries || — || align=right | 1.8 km || 
|-id=387 bgcolor=#fefefe
| 262387 ||  || — || October 16, 2006 || Catalina || CSS || NYS || align=right data-sort-value="0.85" | 850 m || 
|-id=388 bgcolor=#fefefe
| 262388 ||  || — || October 18, 2006 || Piszkéstető || K. Sárneczky || NYS || align=right data-sort-value="0.83" | 830 m || 
|-id=389 bgcolor=#E9E9E9
| 262389 ||  || — || October 16, 2006 || Catalina || CSS || — || align=right | 1.8 km || 
|-id=390 bgcolor=#E9E9E9
| 262390 ||  || — || October 16, 2006 || Catalina || CSS || AGN || align=right | 1.6 km || 
|-id=391 bgcolor=#E9E9E9
| 262391 ||  || — || October 16, 2006 || Kitt Peak || Spacewatch || HOF || align=right | 3.0 km || 
|-id=392 bgcolor=#E9E9E9
| 262392 ||  || — || October 16, 2006 || Catalina || CSS || HNS || align=right | 1.6 km || 
|-id=393 bgcolor=#E9E9E9
| 262393 ||  || — || October 16, 2006 || Kitt Peak || Spacewatch || — || align=right data-sort-value="0.90" | 900 m || 
|-id=394 bgcolor=#fefefe
| 262394 ||  || — || October 17, 2006 || Mount Lemmon || Mount Lemmon Survey || — || align=right data-sort-value="0.99" | 990 m || 
|-id=395 bgcolor=#fefefe
| 262395 ||  || — || October 17, 2006 || Mount Lemmon || Mount Lemmon Survey || — || align=right data-sort-value="0.83" | 830 m || 
|-id=396 bgcolor=#fefefe
| 262396 ||  || — || October 17, 2006 || Mount Lemmon || Mount Lemmon Survey || — || align=right | 1.0 km || 
|-id=397 bgcolor=#E9E9E9
| 262397 ||  || — || October 17, 2006 || Mount Lemmon || Mount Lemmon Survey || MRX || align=right | 1.6 km || 
|-id=398 bgcolor=#E9E9E9
| 262398 ||  || — || October 17, 2006 || Mount Lemmon || Mount Lemmon Survey || — || align=right | 1.8 km || 
|-id=399 bgcolor=#E9E9E9
| 262399 ||  || — || October 17, 2006 || Mount Lemmon || Mount Lemmon Survey || — || align=right | 1.7 km || 
|-id=400 bgcolor=#d6d6d6
| 262400 ||  || — || October 17, 2006 || Mount Lemmon || Mount Lemmon Survey || — || align=right | 3.0 km || 
|}

262401–262500 

|-bgcolor=#E9E9E9
| 262401 ||  || — || October 17, 2006 || Mount Lemmon || Mount Lemmon Survey || — || align=right | 1.6 km || 
|-id=402 bgcolor=#fefefe
| 262402 ||  || — || October 17, 2006 || Mount Lemmon || Mount Lemmon Survey || MAS || align=right data-sort-value="0.76" | 760 m || 
|-id=403 bgcolor=#fefefe
| 262403 ||  || — || October 16, 2006 || Mount Lemmon || Mount Lemmon Survey || V || align=right data-sort-value="0.59" | 590 m || 
|-id=404 bgcolor=#E9E9E9
| 262404 ||  || — || October 16, 2006 || Kitt Peak || Spacewatch || WIT || align=right | 1.3 km || 
|-id=405 bgcolor=#fefefe
| 262405 ||  || — || October 16, 2006 || Kitt Peak || Spacewatch || NYS || align=right data-sort-value="0.69" | 690 m || 
|-id=406 bgcolor=#E9E9E9
| 262406 ||  || — || October 16, 2006 || Kitt Peak || Spacewatch || — || align=right | 2.7 km || 
|-id=407 bgcolor=#E9E9E9
| 262407 ||  || — || October 16, 2006 || Mount Lemmon || Mount Lemmon Survey || — || align=right | 1.8 km || 
|-id=408 bgcolor=#fefefe
| 262408 ||  || — || October 16, 2006 || Kitt Peak || Spacewatch || NYS || align=right data-sort-value="0.74" | 740 m || 
|-id=409 bgcolor=#fefefe
| 262409 ||  || — || October 16, 2006 || Kitt Peak || Spacewatch || — || align=right | 1.0 km || 
|-id=410 bgcolor=#fefefe
| 262410 ||  || — || October 16, 2006 || Kitt Peak || Spacewatch || NYS || align=right data-sort-value="0.78" | 780 m || 
|-id=411 bgcolor=#E9E9E9
| 262411 ||  || — || October 16, 2006 || Kitt Peak || Spacewatch || — || align=right | 1.5 km || 
|-id=412 bgcolor=#E9E9E9
| 262412 ||  || — || October 16, 2006 || Kitt Peak || Spacewatch || — || align=right | 3.2 km || 
|-id=413 bgcolor=#E9E9E9
| 262413 ||  || — || October 16, 2006 || Kitt Peak || Spacewatch || — || align=right | 1.0 km || 
|-id=414 bgcolor=#fefefe
| 262414 ||  || — || October 16, 2006 || Kitt Peak || Spacewatch || — || align=right | 1.1 km || 
|-id=415 bgcolor=#E9E9E9
| 262415 ||  || — || October 16, 2006 || Kitt Peak || Spacewatch || — || align=right | 1.7 km || 
|-id=416 bgcolor=#fefefe
| 262416 ||  || — || October 17, 2006 || Mount Lemmon || Mount Lemmon Survey || NYS || align=right data-sort-value="0.58" | 580 m || 
|-id=417 bgcolor=#E9E9E9
| 262417 ||  || — || October 19, 2006 || Catalina || CSS || WIT || align=right | 1.6 km || 
|-id=418 bgcolor=#fefefe
| 262418 Samofalov ||  ||  || October 17, 2006 || Andrushivka || Andrushivka Obs. || V || align=right | 1.0 km || 
|-id=419 bgcolor=#E9E9E9
| 262419 Suzaka ||  ||  || October 20, 2006 || Nyukasa || Y. Sorimachi, A. Nakajima || — || align=right | 2.5 km || 
|-id=420 bgcolor=#E9E9E9
| 262420 ||  || — || October 16, 2006 || Catalina || CSS || — || align=right | 2.8 km || 
|-id=421 bgcolor=#E9E9E9
| 262421 ||  || — || October 16, 2006 || Catalina || CSS || — || align=right | 1.4 km || 
|-id=422 bgcolor=#fefefe
| 262422 ||  || — || October 16, 2006 || Catalina || CSS || V || align=right data-sort-value="0.89" | 890 m || 
|-id=423 bgcolor=#fefefe
| 262423 ||  || — || October 16, 2006 || Catalina || CSS || — || align=right | 1.4 km || 
|-id=424 bgcolor=#fefefe
| 262424 ||  || — || October 16, 2006 || Kitt Peak || Spacewatch || — || align=right data-sort-value="0.90" | 900 m || 
|-id=425 bgcolor=#E9E9E9
| 262425 ||  || — || October 17, 2006 || Kitt Peak || Spacewatch || WIT || align=right | 1.2 km || 
|-id=426 bgcolor=#E9E9E9
| 262426 ||  || — || October 17, 2006 || Mount Lemmon || Mount Lemmon Survey || — || align=right | 2.4 km || 
|-id=427 bgcolor=#fefefe
| 262427 ||  || — || October 17, 2006 || Mount Lemmon || Mount Lemmon Survey || — || align=right data-sort-value="0.84" | 840 m || 
|-id=428 bgcolor=#fefefe
| 262428 ||  || — || October 17, 2006 || Mount Lemmon || Mount Lemmon Survey || — || align=right data-sort-value="0.96" | 960 m || 
|-id=429 bgcolor=#E9E9E9
| 262429 ||  || — || October 17, 2006 || Mount Lemmon || Mount Lemmon Survey || — || align=right | 2.7 km || 
|-id=430 bgcolor=#E9E9E9
| 262430 ||  || — || October 17, 2006 || Mount Lemmon || Mount Lemmon Survey || — || align=right | 1.3 km || 
|-id=431 bgcolor=#E9E9E9
| 262431 ||  || — || October 17, 2006 || Mount Lemmon || Mount Lemmon Survey || HEN || align=right | 1.2 km || 
|-id=432 bgcolor=#d6d6d6
| 262432 ||  || — || October 17, 2006 || Kitt Peak || Spacewatch || CHA || align=right | 2.3 km || 
|-id=433 bgcolor=#fefefe
| 262433 ||  || — || October 17, 2006 || Mount Lemmon || Mount Lemmon Survey || — || align=right | 1.0 km || 
|-id=434 bgcolor=#E9E9E9
| 262434 ||  || — || October 17, 2006 || Catalina || CSS || MAR || align=right | 1.1 km || 
|-id=435 bgcolor=#fefefe
| 262435 ||  || — || October 17, 2006 || Mount Lemmon || Mount Lemmon Survey || MAS || align=right data-sort-value="0.85" | 850 m || 
|-id=436 bgcolor=#d6d6d6
| 262436 ||  || — || October 17, 2006 || Kitt Peak || Spacewatch || EUP || align=right | 4.8 km || 
|-id=437 bgcolor=#E9E9E9
| 262437 ||  || — || October 17, 2006 || Kitt Peak || Spacewatch || — || align=right | 1.1 km || 
|-id=438 bgcolor=#E9E9E9
| 262438 ||  || — || October 17, 2006 || Mount Lemmon || Mount Lemmon Survey || JUN || align=right | 1.6 km || 
|-id=439 bgcolor=#d6d6d6
| 262439 ||  || — || October 17, 2006 || Kitt Peak || Spacewatch || EOS || align=right | 2.6 km || 
|-id=440 bgcolor=#E9E9E9
| 262440 ||  || — || October 17, 2006 || Kitt Peak || Spacewatch || — || align=right | 1.1 km || 
|-id=441 bgcolor=#d6d6d6
| 262441 ||  || — || October 17, 2006 || Kitt Peak || Spacewatch || — || align=right | 2.8 km || 
|-id=442 bgcolor=#d6d6d6
| 262442 ||  || — || October 18, 2006 || Kitt Peak || Spacewatch || — || align=right | 2.2 km || 
|-id=443 bgcolor=#fefefe
| 262443 ||  || — || October 18, 2006 || Kitt Peak || Spacewatch || NYS || align=right data-sort-value="0.92" | 920 m || 
|-id=444 bgcolor=#fefefe
| 262444 ||  || — || October 18, 2006 || Kitt Peak || Spacewatch || MAS || align=right data-sort-value="0.98" | 980 m || 
|-id=445 bgcolor=#fefefe
| 262445 ||  || — || October 18, 2006 || Kitt Peak || Spacewatch || — || align=right data-sort-value="0.81" | 810 m || 
|-id=446 bgcolor=#fefefe
| 262446 ||  || — || October 18, 2006 || Kitt Peak || Spacewatch || — || align=right data-sort-value="0.78" | 780 m || 
|-id=447 bgcolor=#E9E9E9
| 262447 ||  || — || October 18, 2006 || Kitt Peak || Spacewatch || — || align=right | 2.5 km || 
|-id=448 bgcolor=#fefefe
| 262448 ||  || — || October 18, 2006 || Kitt Peak || Spacewatch || — || align=right | 1.2 km || 
|-id=449 bgcolor=#E9E9E9
| 262449 ||  || — || October 18, 2006 || Kitt Peak || Spacewatch || MAR || align=right | 1.00 km || 
|-id=450 bgcolor=#d6d6d6
| 262450 ||  || — || October 18, 2006 || Kitt Peak || Spacewatch || — || align=right | 5.5 km || 
|-id=451 bgcolor=#E9E9E9
| 262451 ||  || — || October 18, 2006 || Kitt Peak || Spacewatch || — || align=right | 2.9 km || 
|-id=452 bgcolor=#fefefe
| 262452 ||  || — || October 19, 2006 || Kitt Peak || Spacewatch || — || align=right | 1.0 km || 
|-id=453 bgcolor=#fefefe
| 262453 ||  || — || October 19, 2006 || Kitt Peak || Spacewatch || NYS || align=right data-sort-value="0.79" | 790 m || 
|-id=454 bgcolor=#E9E9E9
| 262454 ||  || — || October 19, 2006 || Kitt Peak || Spacewatch || MAR || align=right | 1.4 km || 
|-id=455 bgcolor=#fefefe
| 262455 ||  || — || October 19, 2006 || Kitt Peak || Spacewatch || MAS || align=right data-sort-value="0.72" | 720 m || 
|-id=456 bgcolor=#fefefe
| 262456 ||  || — || October 19, 2006 || Mount Lemmon || Mount Lemmon Survey || — || align=right data-sort-value="0.97" | 970 m || 
|-id=457 bgcolor=#E9E9E9
| 262457 ||  || — || October 19, 2006 || Kitt Peak || Spacewatch || AGN || align=right | 1.2 km || 
|-id=458 bgcolor=#E9E9E9
| 262458 ||  || — || October 19, 2006 || Kitt Peak || Spacewatch || HNA || align=right | 3.0 km || 
|-id=459 bgcolor=#fefefe
| 262459 ||  || — || October 19, 2006 || Kitt Peak || Spacewatch || — || align=right data-sort-value="0.94" | 940 m || 
|-id=460 bgcolor=#E9E9E9
| 262460 ||  || — || October 19, 2006 || Kitt Peak || Spacewatch || — || align=right | 2.2 km || 
|-id=461 bgcolor=#E9E9E9
| 262461 ||  || — || October 19, 2006 || Kitt Peak || Spacewatch || — || align=right | 1.3 km || 
|-id=462 bgcolor=#E9E9E9
| 262462 ||  || — || October 19, 2006 || Kitt Peak || Spacewatch || — || align=right | 2.4 km || 
|-id=463 bgcolor=#E9E9E9
| 262463 ||  || — || October 19, 2006 || Mount Lemmon || Mount Lemmon Survey || AGN || align=right | 1.3 km || 
|-id=464 bgcolor=#E9E9E9
| 262464 ||  || — || October 19, 2006 || Mount Lemmon || Mount Lemmon Survey || — || align=right | 3.0 km || 
|-id=465 bgcolor=#E9E9E9
| 262465 ||  || — || October 20, 2006 || Kitt Peak || Spacewatch || — || align=right | 1.2 km || 
|-id=466 bgcolor=#fefefe
| 262466 ||  || — || October 20, 2006 || Kitt Peak || Spacewatch || V || align=right data-sort-value="0.61" | 610 m || 
|-id=467 bgcolor=#E9E9E9
| 262467 ||  || — || October 20, 2006 || Mount Lemmon || Mount Lemmon Survey || — || align=right | 2.0 km || 
|-id=468 bgcolor=#E9E9E9
| 262468 ||  || — || October 20, 2006 || Catalina || CSS || BRG || align=right | 1.7 km || 
|-id=469 bgcolor=#E9E9E9
| 262469 ||  || — || October 21, 2006 || Kitt Peak || Spacewatch || MAR || align=right | 1.4 km || 
|-id=470 bgcolor=#fefefe
| 262470 ||  || — || October 21, 2006 || Kitt Peak || Spacewatch || — || align=right data-sort-value="0.81" | 810 m || 
|-id=471 bgcolor=#fefefe
| 262471 ||  || — || October 21, 2006 || Mount Lemmon || Mount Lemmon Survey || — || align=right data-sort-value="0.99" | 990 m || 
|-id=472 bgcolor=#fefefe
| 262472 ||  || — || October 21, 2006 || Mount Lemmon || Mount Lemmon Survey || ERI || align=right | 1.9 km || 
|-id=473 bgcolor=#fefefe
| 262473 ||  || — || October 21, 2006 || Mount Lemmon || Mount Lemmon Survey || FLO || align=right data-sort-value="0.71" | 710 m || 
|-id=474 bgcolor=#E9E9E9
| 262474 ||  || — || October 22, 2006 || Mount Lemmon || Mount Lemmon Survey || — || align=right | 1.9 km || 
|-id=475 bgcolor=#fefefe
| 262475 ||  || — || October 16, 2006 || Catalina || CSS || FLO || align=right | 1.1 km || 
|-id=476 bgcolor=#fefefe
| 262476 ||  || — || October 16, 2006 || Catalina || CSS || — || align=right | 1.0 km || 
|-id=477 bgcolor=#E9E9E9
| 262477 ||  || — || October 16, 2006 || Catalina || CSS || — || align=right | 2.3 km || 
|-id=478 bgcolor=#fefefe
| 262478 ||  || — || October 16, 2006 || Catalina || CSS || FLO || align=right data-sort-value="0.94" | 940 m || 
|-id=479 bgcolor=#E9E9E9
| 262479 ||  || — || October 16, 2006 || Catalina || CSS || — || align=right | 1.2 km || 
|-id=480 bgcolor=#fefefe
| 262480 ||  || — || October 19, 2006 || Mount Lemmon || Mount Lemmon Survey || — || align=right | 1.3 km || 
|-id=481 bgcolor=#E9E9E9
| 262481 ||  || — || October 20, 2006 || Kitt Peak || Spacewatch || — || align=right | 1.8 km || 
|-id=482 bgcolor=#E9E9E9
| 262482 ||  || — || October 20, 2006 || Kitt Peak || Spacewatch || XIZ || align=right | 1.6 km || 
|-id=483 bgcolor=#fefefe
| 262483 ||  || — || October 20, 2006 || Kitt Peak || Spacewatch || — || align=right data-sort-value="0.94" | 940 m || 
|-id=484 bgcolor=#fefefe
| 262484 ||  || — || October 20, 2006 || Mount Lemmon || Mount Lemmon Survey || V || align=right data-sort-value="0.99" | 990 m || 
|-id=485 bgcolor=#E9E9E9
| 262485 ||  || — || October 20, 2006 || Kitt Peak || Spacewatch || — || align=right | 2.8 km || 
|-id=486 bgcolor=#fefefe
| 262486 ||  || — || October 21, 2006 || Kitt Peak || Spacewatch || — || align=right data-sort-value="0.97" | 970 m || 
|-id=487 bgcolor=#E9E9E9
| 262487 ||  || — || October 21, 2006 || Kitt Peak || Spacewatch || — || align=right | 1.2 km || 
|-id=488 bgcolor=#E9E9E9
| 262488 ||  || — || October 22, 2006 || Catalina || CSS || MRX || align=right | 1.4 km || 
|-id=489 bgcolor=#E9E9E9
| 262489 ||  || — || October 22, 2006 || Palomar || NEAT || — || align=right | 2.9 km || 
|-id=490 bgcolor=#d6d6d6
| 262490 ||  || — || October 23, 2006 || Kitt Peak || Spacewatch || KOR || align=right | 1.3 km || 
|-id=491 bgcolor=#fefefe
| 262491 ||  || — || October 23, 2006 || Kitt Peak || Spacewatch || — || align=right data-sort-value="0.93" | 930 m || 
|-id=492 bgcolor=#d6d6d6
| 262492 ||  || — || October 23, 2006 || Kitt Peak || Spacewatch || — || align=right | 2.4 km || 
|-id=493 bgcolor=#fefefe
| 262493 ||  || — || October 23, 2006 || Kitt Peak || Spacewatch || NYS || align=right data-sort-value="0.89" | 890 m || 
|-id=494 bgcolor=#E9E9E9
| 262494 ||  || — || October 16, 2006 || Catalina || CSS || — || align=right | 1.8 km || 
|-id=495 bgcolor=#E9E9E9
| 262495 ||  || — || October 20, 2006 || Kitt Peak || Spacewatch || — || align=right | 1.8 km || 
|-id=496 bgcolor=#fefefe
| 262496 ||  || — || October 20, 2006 || Kitt Peak || Spacewatch || NYS || align=right data-sort-value="0.74" | 740 m || 
|-id=497 bgcolor=#E9E9E9
| 262497 ||  || — || October 20, 2006 || Palomar || NEAT || — || align=right | 1.2 km || 
|-id=498 bgcolor=#E9E9E9
| 262498 ||  || — || October 21, 2006 || Mount Lemmon || Mount Lemmon Survey || — || align=right | 3.8 km || 
|-id=499 bgcolor=#fefefe
| 262499 ||  || — || October 23, 2006 || Kitt Peak || Spacewatch || — || align=right data-sort-value="0.94" | 940 m || 
|-id=500 bgcolor=#E9E9E9
| 262500 ||  || — || October 23, 2006 || Kitt Peak || Spacewatch || — || align=right | 1.2 km || 
|}

262501–262600 

|-bgcolor=#fefefe
| 262501 ||  || — || October 23, 2006 || Mount Lemmon || Mount Lemmon Survey || V || align=right data-sort-value="0.99" | 990 m || 
|-id=502 bgcolor=#E9E9E9
| 262502 ||  || — || October 27, 2006 || Mount Lemmon || Mount Lemmon Survey || — || align=right | 2.2 km || 
|-id=503 bgcolor=#d6d6d6
| 262503 ||  || — || October 28, 2006 || Kitt Peak || Spacewatch || KOR || align=right | 1.3 km || 
|-id=504 bgcolor=#fefefe
| 262504 ||  || — || October 28, 2006 || Mount Lemmon || Mount Lemmon Survey || V || align=right data-sort-value="0.68" | 680 m || 
|-id=505 bgcolor=#E9E9E9
| 262505 ||  || — || October 28, 2006 || Mount Lemmon || Mount Lemmon Survey || ADE || align=right | 2.8 km || 
|-id=506 bgcolor=#fefefe
| 262506 ||  || — || October 28, 2006 || Mount Lemmon || Mount Lemmon Survey || MAS || align=right data-sort-value="0.65" | 650 m || 
|-id=507 bgcolor=#fefefe
| 262507 ||  || — || October 27, 2006 || Kitt Peak || Spacewatch || — || align=right data-sort-value="0.88" | 880 m || 
|-id=508 bgcolor=#E9E9E9
| 262508 ||  || — || October 27, 2006 || Kitt Peak || Spacewatch || — || align=right | 1.2 km || 
|-id=509 bgcolor=#E9E9E9
| 262509 ||  || — || October 27, 2006 || Mount Lemmon || Mount Lemmon Survey || — || align=right | 1.8 km || 
|-id=510 bgcolor=#E9E9E9
| 262510 ||  || — || October 27, 2006 || Catalina || CSS || — || align=right | 2.5 km || 
|-id=511 bgcolor=#fefefe
| 262511 ||  || — || October 27, 2006 || Mount Lemmon || Mount Lemmon Survey || MAS || align=right | 1.1 km || 
|-id=512 bgcolor=#fefefe
| 262512 ||  || — || October 27, 2006 || Kitt Peak || Spacewatch || — || align=right | 1.3 km || 
|-id=513 bgcolor=#d6d6d6
| 262513 ||  || — || October 27, 2006 || Kitt Peak || Spacewatch || — || align=right | 3.5 km || 
|-id=514 bgcolor=#fefefe
| 262514 ||  || — || October 27, 2006 || Kitt Peak || Spacewatch || — || align=right | 1.2 km || 
|-id=515 bgcolor=#E9E9E9
| 262515 ||  || — || October 28, 2006 || Mount Lemmon || Mount Lemmon Survey || HEN || align=right data-sort-value="0.82" | 820 m || 
|-id=516 bgcolor=#fefefe
| 262516 ||  || — || October 28, 2006 || Kitt Peak || Spacewatch || NYS || align=right data-sort-value="0.66" | 660 m || 
|-id=517 bgcolor=#d6d6d6
| 262517 ||  || — || October 28, 2006 || Mount Lemmon || Mount Lemmon Survey || KAR || align=right | 1.1 km || 
|-id=518 bgcolor=#E9E9E9
| 262518 ||  || — || October 28, 2006 || Mount Lemmon || Mount Lemmon Survey || — || align=right | 1.3 km || 
|-id=519 bgcolor=#E9E9E9
| 262519 ||  || — || October 28, 2006 || Mount Lemmon || Mount Lemmon Survey || WIT || align=right | 1.7 km || 
|-id=520 bgcolor=#E9E9E9
| 262520 ||  || — || October 28, 2006 || Mount Lemmon || Mount Lemmon Survey || — || align=right data-sort-value="0.98" | 980 m || 
|-id=521 bgcolor=#fefefe
| 262521 ||  || — || October 28, 2006 || Kitt Peak || Spacewatch || FLO || align=right data-sort-value="0.96" | 960 m || 
|-id=522 bgcolor=#fefefe
| 262522 ||  || — || October 28, 2006 || Kitt Peak || Spacewatch || — || align=right data-sort-value="0.85" | 850 m || 
|-id=523 bgcolor=#E9E9E9
| 262523 ||  || — || October 31, 2006 || Kitt Peak || Spacewatch || — || align=right | 1.7 km || 
|-id=524 bgcolor=#fefefe
| 262524 ||  || — || October 19, 2006 || Kitt Peak || Spacewatch || — || align=right | 1.2 km || 
|-id=525 bgcolor=#E9E9E9
| 262525 ||  || — || October 19, 2006 || Kitt Peak || M. W. Buie || — || align=right | 1.4 km || 
|-id=526 bgcolor=#E9E9E9
| 262526 ||  || — || October 19, 2006 || Kitt Peak || M. W. Buie || — || align=right | 1.9 km || 
|-id=527 bgcolor=#d6d6d6
| 262527 ||  || — || October 31, 2006 || Mount Lemmon || Mount Lemmon Survey || — || align=right | 3.1 km || 
|-id=528 bgcolor=#E9E9E9
| 262528 ||  || — || October 17, 2006 || Mount Lemmon || Mount Lemmon Survey || — || align=right data-sort-value="0.91" | 910 m || 
|-id=529 bgcolor=#d6d6d6
| 262529 ||  || — || October 23, 2006 || Palomar || NEAT || — || align=right | 3.5 km || 
|-id=530 bgcolor=#d6d6d6
| 262530 ||  || — || October 29, 2006 || Catalina || CSS || EOS || align=right | 4.4 km || 
|-id=531 bgcolor=#fefefe
| 262531 ||  || — || October 30, 2006 || Catalina || CSS || LCI || align=right | 1.7 km || 
|-id=532 bgcolor=#E9E9E9
| 262532 ||  || — || October 17, 2006 || Mount Lemmon || Mount Lemmon Survey || HEN || align=right | 1.1 km || 
|-id=533 bgcolor=#E9E9E9
| 262533 ||  || — || October 23, 2006 || Mount Lemmon || Mount Lemmon Survey || RAF || align=right | 1.0 km || 
|-id=534 bgcolor=#fefefe
| 262534 ||  || — || October 27, 2006 || Mount Lemmon || Mount Lemmon Survey || — || align=right data-sort-value="0.97" | 970 m || 
|-id=535 bgcolor=#E9E9E9
| 262535 ||  || — || October 19, 2006 || Mount Lemmon || Mount Lemmon Survey || — || align=right | 2.0 km || 
|-id=536 bgcolor=#fefefe
| 262536 Nowikow ||  ||  || October 26, 2006 || Mauna Kea || P. A. Wiegert, A. Papadimos || MAS || align=right data-sort-value="0.87" | 870 m || 
|-id=537 bgcolor=#E9E9E9
| 262537 ||  || — || October 21, 2006 || Kitt Peak || Spacewatch || — || align=right | 2.0 km || 
|-id=538 bgcolor=#fefefe
| 262538 || 2006 VF || — || November 1, 2006 || 7300 Observatory || W. K. Y. Yeung || FLO || align=right data-sort-value="0.99" | 990 m || 
|-id=539 bgcolor=#E9E9E9
| 262539 ||  || — || November 9, 2006 || Kitt Peak || Spacewatch || — || align=right | 3.7 km || 
|-id=540 bgcolor=#fefefe
| 262540 ||  || — || November 10, 2006 || Kitt Peak || Spacewatch || — || align=right | 1.1 km || 
|-id=541 bgcolor=#E9E9E9
| 262541 ||  || — || November 10, 2006 || Kitt Peak || Spacewatch || — || align=right data-sort-value="0.89" | 890 m || 
|-id=542 bgcolor=#fefefe
| 262542 ||  || — || November 10, 2006 || Kitt Peak || Spacewatch || NYS || align=right data-sort-value="0.85" | 850 m || 
|-id=543 bgcolor=#fefefe
| 262543 ||  || — || November 11, 2006 || Kitt Peak || Spacewatch || MAS || align=right | 1.00 km || 
|-id=544 bgcolor=#E9E9E9
| 262544 ||  || — || November 11, 2006 || Kitt Peak || Spacewatch || — || align=right | 1.3 km || 
|-id=545 bgcolor=#E9E9E9
| 262545 ||  || — || November 11, 2006 || Kitt Peak || Spacewatch || — || align=right | 2.5 km || 
|-id=546 bgcolor=#E9E9E9
| 262546 ||  || — || November 11, 2006 || Catalina || CSS || — || align=right | 1.7 km || 
|-id=547 bgcolor=#fefefe
| 262547 ||  || — || November 11, 2006 || Catalina || CSS || MAS || align=right data-sort-value="0.63" | 630 m || 
|-id=548 bgcolor=#fefefe
| 262548 ||  || — || November 11, 2006 || Mount Lemmon || Mount Lemmon Survey || — || align=right data-sort-value="0.98" | 980 m || 
|-id=549 bgcolor=#E9E9E9
| 262549 ||  || — || November 9, 2006 || Kitt Peak || Spacewatch || AGN || align=right | 1.4 km || 
|-id=550 bgcolor=#d6d6d6
| 262550 ||  || — || November 9, 2006 || Kitt Peak || Spacewatch || — || align=right | 2.7 km || 
|-id=551 bgcolor=#fefefe
| 262551 ||  || — || November 9, 2006 || Kitt Peak || Spacewatch || — || align=right data-sort-value="0.97" | 970 m || 
|-id=552 bgcolor=#E9E9E9
| 262552 ||  || — || November 9, 2006 || Kitt Peak || Spacewatch || — || align=right | 2.5 km || 
|-id=553 bgcolor=#E9E9E9
| 262553 ||  || — || November 9, 2006 || Kitt Peak || Spacewatch || — || align=right | 1.8 km || 
|-id=554 bgcolor=#fefefe
| 262554 ||  || — || November 10, 2006 || Kitt Peak || Spacewatch || MAS || align=right | 1.00 km || 
|-id=555 bgcolor=#d6d6d6
| 262555 ||  || — || November 10, 2006 || Kitt Peak || Spacewatch || K-2 || align=right | 1.5 km || 
|-id=556 bgcolor=#fefefe
| 262556 ||  || — || November 10, 2006 || Kitt Peak || Spacewatch || — || align=right | 1.2 km || 
|-id=557 bgcolor=#E9E9E9
| 262557 ||  || — || November 10, 2006 || Kitt Peak || Spacewatch || — || align=right | 2.1 km || 
|-id=558 bgcolor=#E9E9E9
| 262558 ||  || — || November 10, 2006 || Kitt Peak || Spacewatch || EUN || align=right | 1.6 km || 
|-id=559 bgcolor=#fefefe
| 262559 ||  || — || November 10, 2006 || Kitt Peak || Spacewatch || NYS || align=right data-sort-value="0.80" | 800 m || 
|-id=560 bgcolor=#fefefe
| 262560 ||  || — || November 10, 2006 || Kitt Peak || Spacewatch || V || align=right data-sort-value="0.73" | 730 m || 
|-id=561 bgcolor=#fefefe
| 262561 ||  || — || November 10, 2006 || Kitt Peak || Spacewatch || — || align=right | 1.1 km || 
|-id=562 bgcolor=#E9E9E9
| 262562 ||  || — || November 10, 2006 || Kitt Peak || Spacewatch || — || align=right | 3.7 km || 
|-id=563 bgcolor=#fefefe
| 262563 ||  || — || November 10, 2006 || Kitt Peak || Spacewatch || V || align=right data-sort-value="0.85" | 850 m || 
|-id=564 bgcolor=#d6d6d6
| 262564 ||  || — || November 10, 2006 || Kitt Peak || Spacewatch || — || align=right | 5.1 km || 
|-id=565 bgcolor=#d6d6d6
| 262565 ||  || — || November 10, 2006 || Kitt Peak || Spacewatch || — || align=right | 4.4 km || 
|-id=566 bgcolor=#fefefe
| 262566 ||  || — || November 10, 2006 || Kitt Peak || Spacewatch || NYS || align=right data-sort-value="0.98" | 980 m || 
|-id=567 bgcolor=#fefefe
| 262567 ||  || — || November 11, 2006 || Mount Lemmon || Mount Lemmon Survey || NYS || align=right | 1.0 km || 
|-id=568 bgcolor=#E9E9E9
| 262568 ||  || — || November 11, 2006 || Mount Lemmon || Mount Lemmon Survey || — || align=right | 1.2 km || 
|-id=569 bgcolor=#fefefe
| 262569 ||  || — || November 12, 2006 || Mount Lemmon || Mount Lemmon Survey || NYS || align=right | 1.0 km || 
|-id=570 bgcolor=#E9E9E9
| 262570 ||  || — || November 13, 2006 || Kitt Peak || Spacewatch || — || align=right | 1.2 km || 
|-id=571 bgcolor=#d6d6d6
| 262571 ||  || — || November 13, 2006 || Kitt Peak || Spacewatch || — || align=right | 3.0 km || 
|-id=572 bgcolor=#E9E9E9
| 262572 ||  || — || November 10, 2006 || Kitt Peak || Spacewatch || — || align=right | 1.4 km || 
|-id=573 bgcolor=#E9E9E9
| 262573 ||  || — || November 11, 2006 || Kitt Peak || Spacewatch || AGN || align=right | 1.5 km || 
|-id=574 bgcolor=#E9E9E9
| 262574 ||  || — || November 11, 2006 || Kitt Peak || Spacewatch || — || align=right | 1.2 km || 
|-id=575 bgcolor=#d6d6d6
| 262575 ||  || — || November 11, 2006 || Kitt Peak || Spacewatch || EOS || align=right | 2.5 km || 
|-id=576 bgcolor=#fefefe
| 262576 ||  || — || November 11, 2006 || Kitt Peak || Spacewatch || MAS || align=right | 1.0 km || 
|-id=577 bgcolor=#d6d6d6
| 262577 ||  || — || November 11, 2006 || Kitt Peak || Spacewatch || KOR || align=right | 1.7 km || 
|-id=578 bgcolor=#E9E9E9
| 262578 ||  || — || November 11, 2006 || Kitt Peak || Spacewatch || — || align=right | 1.6 km || 
|-id=579 bgcolor=#E9E9E9
| 262579 ||  || — || November 11, 2006 || Kitt Peak || Spacewatch || — || align=right | 2.8 km || 
|-id=580 bgcolor=#fefefe
| 262580 ||  || — || November 11, 2006 || Mount Lemmon || Mount Lemmon Survey || — || align=right | 1.1 km || 
|-id=581 bgcolor=#fefefe
| 262581 ||  || — || November 11, 2006 || Kitt Peak || Spacewatch || — || align=right data-sort-value="0.93" | 930 m || 
|-id=582 bgcolor=#d6d6d6
| 262582 ||  || — || November 11, 2006 || Mount Lemmon || Mount Lemmon Survey || — || align=right | 3.6 km || 
|-id=583 bgcolor=#fefefe
| 262583 ||  || — || November 12, 2006 || Mount Lemmon || Mount Lemmon Survey || — || align=right | 1.3 km || 
|-id=584 bgcolor=#d6d6d6
| 262584 ||  || — || November 12, 2006 || Lulin || H.-C. Lin, Q.-z. Ye || — || align=right | 4.8 km || 
|-id=585 bgcolor=#E9E9E9
| 262585 ||  || — || November 13, 2006 || Kitt Peak || Spacewatch || — || align=right data-sort-value="0.91" | 910 m || 
|-id=586 bgcolor=#fefefe
| 262586 ||  || — || November 14, 2006 || Socorro || LINEAR || — || align=right | 1.2 km || 
|-id=587 bgcolor=#fefefe
| 262587 ||  || — || November 15, 2006 || Ottmarsheim || C. Rinner || NYS || align=right data-sort-value="0.95" | 950 m || 
|-id=588 bgcolor=#E9E9E9
| 262588 ||  || — || November 10, 2006 || Kitt Peak || Spacewatch || — || align=right | 2.7 km || 
|-id=589 bgcolor=#E9E9E9
| 262589 ||  || — || November 10, 2006 || Kitt Peak || Spacewatch || — || align=right | 1.2 km || 
|-id=590 bgcolor=#d6d6d6
| 262590 ||  || — || November 11, 2006 || Kitt Peak || Spacewatch || EUP || align=right | 5.5 km || 
|-id=591 bgcolor=#fefefe
| 262591 ||  || — || November 11, 2006 || Catalina || CSS || V || align=right data-sort-value="0.78" | 780 m || 
|-id=592 bgcolor=#E9E9E9
| 262592 ||  || — || November 11, 2006 || Catalina || CSS || — || align=right | 1.1 km || 
|-id=593 bgcolor=#fefefe
| 262593 ||  || — || November 12, 2006 || Mount Lemmon || Mount Lemmon Survey || NYS || align=right data-sort-value="0.72" | 720 m || 
|-id=594 bgcolor=#fefefe
| 262594 ||  || — || November 13, 2006 || Catalina || CSS || — || align=right | 3.0 km || 
|-id=595 bgcolor=#d6d6d6
| 262595 ||  || — || November 13, 2006 || Kitt Peak || Spacewatch || — || align=right | 3.1 km || 
|-id=596 bgcolor=#E9E9E9
| 262596 ||  || — || November 14, 2006 || Mount Lemmon || Mount Lemmon Survey || — || align=right | 1.5 km || 
|-id=597 bgcolor=#E9E9E9
| 262597 ||  || — || November 14, 2006 || Catalina || CSS || MAR || align=right | 1.5 km || 
|-id=598 bgcolor=#fefefe
| 262598 ||  || — || November 14, 2006 || Socorro || LINEAR || V || align=right data-sort-value="0.92" | 920 m || 
|-id=599 bgcolor=#E9E9E9
| 262599 ||  || — || November 14, 2006 || Kitt Peak || Spacewatch || HOF || align=right | 3.2 km || 
|-id=600 bgcolor=#E9E9E9
| 262600 ||  || — || November 14, 2006 || Kitt Peak || Spacewatch || — || align=right | 1.4 km || 
|}

262601–262700 

|-bgcolor=#E9E9E9
| 262601 ||  || — || November 14, 2006 || Kitt Peak || Spacewatch || — || align=right | 1.3 km || 
|-id=602 bgcolor=#fefefe
| 262602 ||  || — || November 14, 2006 || Catalina || CSS || V || align=right data-sort-value="0.83" | 830 m || 
|-id=603 bgcolor=#E9E9E9
| 262603 ||  || — || November 14, 2006 || Kitt Peak || Spacewatch || RAF || align=right | 1.2 km || 
|-id=604 bgcolor=#d6d6d6
| 262604 ||  || — || November 14, 2006 || Kitt Peak || Spacewatch || — || align=right | 2.8 km || 
|-id=605 bgcolor=#E9E9E9
| 262605 ||  || — || November 15, 2006 || Socorro || LINEAR || CLO || align=right | 2.5 km || 
|-id=606 bgcolor=#fefefe
| 262606 ||  || — || November 15, 2006 || Mount Lemmon || Mount Lemmon Survey || MAS || align=right data-sort-value="0.75" | 750 m || 
|-id=607 bgcolor=#fefefe
| 262607 ||  || — || November 15, 2006 || Kitt Peak || Spacewatch || NYS || align=right data-sort-value="0.76" | 760 m || 
|-id=608 bgcolor=#d6d6d6
| 262608 ||  || — || November 15, 2006 || Kitt Peak || Spacewatch || KAR || align=right | 1.3 km || 
|-id=609 bgcolor=#E9E9E9
| 262609 ||  || — || November 13, 2006 || La Sagra || OAM Obs. || HEN || align=right | 1.5 km || 
|-id=610 bgcolor=#E9E9E9
| 262610 ||  || — || November 15, 2006 || Catalina || CSS || — || align=right | 2.8 km || 
|-id=611 bgcolor=#E9E9E9
| 262611 ||  || — || November 15, 2006 || Catalina || CSS || — || align=right | 2.7 km || 
|-id=612 bgcolor=#E9E9E9
| 262612 ||  || — || November 15, 2006 || Mount Lemmon || Mount Lemmon Survey || — || align=right | 1.5 km || 
|-id=613 bgcolor=#E9E9E9
| 262613 ||  || — || November 9, 2006 || Palomar || NEAT || — || align=right | 2.9 km || 
|-id=614 bgcolor=#fefefe
| 262614 ||  || — || November 9, 2006 || Palomar || NEAT || MAS || align=right data-sort-value="0.75" | 750 m || 
|-id=615 bgcolor=#fefefe
| 262615 ||  || — || November 9, 2006 || Palomar || NEAT || MAS || align=right data-sort-value="0.86" | 860 m || 
|-id=616 bgcolor=#E9E9E9
| 262616 ||  || — || November 9, 2006 || Palomar || NEAT || HNS || align=right | 1.6 km || 
|-id=617 bgcolor=#E9E9E9
| 262617 ||  || — || November 8, 2006 || Palomar || NEAT || HEN || align=right | 1.3 km || 
|-id=618 bgcolor=#fefefe
| 262618 ||  || — || November 1, 2006 || Kitt Peak || Spacewatch || NYS || align=right data-sort-value="0.63" | 630 m || 
|-id=619 bgcolor=#fefefe
| 262619 ||  || — || November 13, 2006 || Mount Lemmon || Mount Lemmon Survey || CLA || align=right | 1.8 km || 
|-id=620 bgcolor=#E9E9E9
| 262620 ||  || — || November 18, 2006 || 7300 || W. K. Y. Yeung || — || align=right | 1.3 km || 
|-id=621 bgcolor=#E9E9E9
| 262621 ||  || — || November 16, 2006 || Needville || Needville Obs. || — || align=right | 1.3 km || 
|-id=622 bgcolor=#d6d6d6
| 262622 ||  || — || November 20, 2006 || 7300 || W. K. Y. Yeung || — || align=right | 2.9 km || 
|-id=623 bgcolor=#FFC2E0
| 262623 ||  || — || November 17, 2006 || Siding Spring || SSS || ATE || align=right data-sort-value="0.76" | 760 m || 
|-id=624 bgcolor=#E9E9E9
| 262624 ||  || — || November 19, 2006 || Socorro || LINEAR || — || align=right | 1.8 km || 
|-id=625 bgcolor=#E9E9E9
| 262625 ||  || — || November 16, 2006 || Kitt Peak || Spacewatch || HOF || align=right | 3.3 km || 
|-id=626 bgcolor=#E9E9E9
| 262626 ||  || — || November 16, 2006 || Mount Lemmon || Mount Lemmon Survey || EUN || align=right | 1.6 km || 
|-id=627 bgcolor=#E9E9E9
| 262627 ||  || — || November 17, 2006 || Kitt Peak || Spacewatch || — || align=right | 1.7 km || 
|-id=628 bgcolor=#E9E9E9
| 262628 ||  || — || November 17, 2006 || Mount Lemmon || Mount Lemmon Survey || — || align=right | 1.2 km || 
|-id=629 bgcolor=#E9E9E9
| 262629 ||  || — || November 17, 2006 || Mount Lemmon || Mount Lemmon Survey || — || align=right | 1.7 km || 
|-id=630 bgcolor=#E9E9E9
| 262630 ||  || — || November 22, 2006 || 7300 || W. K. Y. Yeung || — || align=right | 1.2 km || 
|-id=631 bgcolor=#fefefe
| 262631 ||  || — || November 16, 2006 || Kitt Peak || Spacewatch || — || align=right | 1.1 km || 
|-id=632 bgcolor=#E9E9E9
| 262632 ||  || — || November 16, 2006 || Kitt Peak || Spacewatch || — || align=right | 2.0 km || 
|-id=633 bgcolor=#E9E9E9
| 262633 ||  || — || November 16, 2006 || Kitt Peak || Spacewatch || — || align=right | 1.9 km || 
|-id=634 bgcolor=#d6d6d6
| 262634 ||  || — || November 16, 2006 || Kitt Peak || Spacewatch || — || align=right | 4.3 km || 
|-id=635 bgcolor=#E9E9E9
| 262635 ||  || — || November 16, 2006 || Kitt Peak || Spacewatch || NEM || align=right | 3.0 km || 
|-id=636 bgcolor=#d6d6d6
| 262636 ||  || — || November 16, 2006 || Kitt Peak || Spacewatch || EOS || align=right | 2.2 km || 
|-id=637 bgcolor=#E9E9E9
| 262637 ||  || — || November 16, 2006 || Mount Lemmon || Mount Lemmon Survey || JUN || align=right | 1.3 km || 
|-id=638 bgcolor=#E9E9E9
| 262638 ||  || — || November 16, 2006 || Mount Lemmon || Mount Lemmon Survey || — || align=right | 2.0 km || 
|-id=639 bgcolor=#E9E9E9
| 262639 ||  || — || November 16, 2006 || Catalina || CSS || — || align=right | 3.1 km || 
|-id=640 bgcolor=#d6d6d6
| 262640 ||  || — || November 16, 2006 || Kitt Peak || Spacewatch || — || align=right | 3.4 km || 
|-id=641 bgcolor=#E9E9E9
| 262641 ||  || — || November 16, 2006 || Mount Lemmon || Mount Lemmon Survey || — || align=right | 3.1 km || 
|-id=642 bgcolor=#fefefe
| 262642 ||  || — || November 16, 2006 || Kitt Peak || Spacewatch || SUL || align=right | 2.5 km || 
|-id=643 bgcolor=#E9E9E9
| 262643 ||  || — || November 16, 2006 || Kitt Peak || Spacewatch || — || align=right | 2.1 km || 
|-id=644 bgcolor=#E9E9E9
| 262644 ||  || — || November 16, 2006 || Mount Lemmon || Mount Lemmon Survey || — || align=right | 2.7 km || 
|-id=645 bgcolor=#E9E9E9
| 262645 ||  || — || November 16, 2006 || Kitt Peak || Spacewatch || — || align=right | 1.2 km || 
|-id=646 bgcolor=#fefefe
| 262646 ||  || — || November 16, 2006 || Kitt Peak || Spacewatch || NYS || align=right data-sort-value="0.91" | 910 m || 
|-id=647 bgcolor=#E9E9E9
| 262647 ||  || — || November 16, 2006 || Kitt Peak || Spacewatch || — || align=right | 1.4 km || 
|-id=648 bgcolor=#E9E9E9
| 262648 ||  || — || November 16, 2006 || Kitt Peak || Spacewatch || — || align=right | 2.7 km || 
|-id=649 bgcolor=#fefefe
| 262649 ||  || — || November 17, 2006 || Mount Lemmon || Mount Lemmon Survey || — || align=right | 1.1 km || 
|-id=650 bgcolor=#E9E9E9
| 262650 ||  || — || November 17, 2006 || Catalina || CSS || — || align=right | 1.8 km || 
|-id=651 bgcolor=#E9E9E9
| 262651 ||  || — || November 17, 2006 || Mount Lemmon || Mount Lemmon Survey || — || align=right | 1.1 km || 
|-id=652 bgcolor=#E9E9E9
| 262652 ||  || — || November 17, 2006 || Mount Lemmon || Mount Lemmon Survey || — || align=right | 1.4 km || 
|-id=653 bgcolor=#E9E9E9
| 262653 ||  || — || November 18, 2006 || Kitt Peak || Spacewatch || AGN || align=right | 1.4 km || 
|-id=654 bgcolor=#E9E9E9
| 262654 ||  || — || November 18, 2006 || Socorro || LINEAR || — || align=right | 1.3 km || 
|-id=655 bgcolor=#d6d6d6
| 262655 ||  || — || November 18, 2006 || Mount Lemmon || Mount Lemmon Survey || — || align=right | 5.6 km || 
|-id=656 bgcolor=#E9E9E9
| 262656 ||  || — || November 18, 2006 || Mount Lemmon || Mount Lemmon Survey || — || align=right | 1.7 km || 
|-id=657 bgcolor=#E9E9E9
| 262657 ||  || — || November 19, 2006 || Kitt Peak || Spacewatch || JUN || align=right | 1.5 km || 
|-id=658 bgcolor=#E9E9E9
| 262658 ||  || — || November 19, 2006 || Kitt Peak || Spacewatch || — || align=right | 2.0 km || 
|-id=659 bgcolor=#E9E9E9
| 262659 ||  || — || November 19, 2006 || Kitt Peak || Spacewatch || — || align=right | 2.0 km || 
|-id=660 bgcolor=#E9E9E9
| 262660 ||  || — || November 19, 2006 || Kitt Peak || Spacewatch || — || align=right | 1.8 km || 
|-id=661 bgcolor=#d6d6d6
| 262661 ||  || — || November 19, 2006 || Kitt Peak || Spacewatch || — || align=right | 4.6 km || 
|-id=662 bgcolor=#E9E9E9
| 262662 ||  || — || November 19, 2006 || Kitt Peak || Spacewatch || — || align=right | 1.6 km || 
|-id=663 bgcolor=#E9E9E9
| 262663 ||  || — || November 19, 2006 || Kitt Peak || Spacewatch || — || align=right data-sort-value="0.99" | 990 m || 
|-id=664 bgcolor=#d6d6d6
| 262664 ||  || — || November 19, 2006 || Kitt Peak || Spacewatch || — || align=right | 3.0 km || 
|-id=665 bgcolor=#E9E9E9
| 262665 ||  || — || November 19, 2006 || Kitt Peak || Spacewatch || — || align=right | 1.6 km || 
|-id=666 bgcolor=#E9E9E9
| 262666 ||  || — || November 19, 2006 || Kitt Peak || Spacewatch || — || align=right | 1.8 km || 
|-id=667 bgcolor=#fefefe
| 262667 ||  || — || November 21, 2006 || Mount Lemmon || Mount Lemmon Survey || — || align=right data-sort-value="0.71" | 710 m || 
|-id=668 bgcolor=#E9E9E9
| 262668 ||  || — || November 21, 2006 || Socorro || LINEAR || — || align=right | 1.9 km || 
|-id=669 bgcolor=#E9E9E9
| 262669 ||  || — || November 21, 2006 || Mount Lemmon || Mount Lemmon Survey || POS || align=right | 5.1 km || 
|-id=670 bgcolor=#fefefe
| 262670 ||  || — || November 26, 2006 || 7300 || W. K. Y. Yeung || — || align=right | 1.1 km || 
|-id=671 bgcolor=#fefefe
| 262671 ||  || — || November 19, 2006 || Catalina || CSS || V || align=right data-sort-value="0.68" | 680 m || 
|-id=672 bgcolor=#fefefe
| 262672 ||  || — || November 19, 2006 || Catalina || CSS || V || align=right data-sort-value="0.95" | 950 m || 
|-id=673 bgcolor=#d6d6d6
| 262673 ||  || — || November 20, 2006 || Kitt Peak || Spacewatch || — || align=right | 2.4 km || 
|-id=674 bgcolor=#E9E9E9
| 262674 ||  || — || November 20, 2006 || Kitt Peak || Spacewatch || — || align=right | 2.5 km || 
|-id=675 bgcolor=#d6d6d6
| 262675 ||  || — || November 20, 2006 || Kitt Peak || Spacewatch || EOS || align=right | 2.7 km || 
|-id=676 bgcolor=#E9E9E9
| 262676 ||  || — || November 20, 2006 || Socorro || LINEAR || — || align=right | 4.0 km || 
|-id=677 bgcolor=#E9E9E9
| 262677 ||  || — || November 20, 2006 || Kitt Peak || Spacewatch || GEF || align=right | 1.4 km || 
|-id=678 bgcolor=#E9E9E9
| 262678 ||  || — || November 21, 2006 || Mount Lemmon || Mount Lemmon Survey || — || align=right | 1.2 km || 
|-id=679 bgcolor=#E9E9E9
| 262679 ||  || — || November 22, 2006 || Socorro || LINEAR || — || align=right | 1.7 km || 
|-id=680 bgcolor=#E9E9E9
| 262680 ||  || — || November 22, 2006 || Mount Lemmon || Mount Lemmon Survey || — || align=right | 2.1 km || 
|-id=681 bgcolor=#d6d6d6
| 262681 ||  || — || November 22, 2006 || Kitt Peak || Spacewatch || — || align=right | 3.9 km || 
|-id=682 bgcolor=#d6d6d6
| 262682 ||  || — || November 22, 2006 || Mount Lemmon || Mount Lemmon Survey || — || align=right | 6.4 km || 
|-id=683 bgcolor=#d6d6d6
| 262683 ||  || — || November 23, 2006 || Kitt Peak || Spacewatch || — || align=right | 4.5 km || 
|-id=684 bgcolor=#E9E9E9
| 262684 ||  || — || November 23, 2006 || Kitt Peak || Spacewatch || HEN || align=right data-sort-value="0.98" | 980 m || 
|-id=685 bgcolor=#E9E9E9
| 262685 ||  || — || November 23, 2006 || Kitt Peak || Spacewatch || — || align=right | 1.1 km || 
|-id=686 bgcolor=#d6d6d6
| 262686 ||  || — || November 23, 2006 || Kitt Peak || Spacewatch || — || align=right | 3.2 km || 
|-id=687 bgcolor=#E9E9E9
| 262687 ||  || — || November 23, 2006 || Kitt Peak || Spacewatch || ADE || align=right | 2.4 km || 
|-id=688 bgcolor=#E9E9E9
| 262688 ||  || — || November 23, 2006 || Mount Lemmon || Mount Lemmon Survey || — || align=right | 2.6 km || 
|-id=689 bgcolor=#E9E9E9
| 262689 ||  || — || November 24, 2006 || Mount Lemmon || Mount Lemmon Survey || — || align=right | 1.5 km || 
|-id=690 bgcolor=#d6d6d6
| 262690 ||  || — || November 27, 2006 || Marly || Naef Obs. || — || align=right | 5.7 km || 
|-id=691 bgcolor=#E9E9E9
| 262691 ||  || — || November 17, 2006 || Palomar || NEAT || — || align=right | 3.1 km || 
|-id=692 bgcolor=#fefefe
| 262692 ||  || — || November 25, 2006 || Mount Lemmon || Mount Lemmon Survey || — || align=right | 1.3 km || 
|-id=693 bgcolor=#d6d6d6
| 262693 ||  || — || November 27, 2006 || Kitt Peak || Spacewatch || — || align=right | 2.9 km || 
|-id=694 bgcolor=#fefefe
| 262694 ||  || — || November 27, 2006 || Kitt Peak || Spacewatch || — || align=right data-sort-value="0.94" | 940 m || 
|-id=695 bgcolor=#E9E9E9
| 262695 ||  || — || November 27, 2006 || Kitt Peak || Spacewatch || — || align=right | 1.6 km || 
|-id=696 bgcolor=#fefefe
| 262696 ||  || — || November 27, 2006 || Kitt Peak || Spacewatch || — || align=right | 1.2 km || 
|-id=697 bgcolor=#E9E9E9
| 262697 ||  || — || November 28, 2006 || Kitt Peak || Spacewatch || — || align=right | 1.7 km || 
|-id=698 bgcolor=#E9E9E9
| 262698 ||  || — || November 29, 2006 || Socorro || LINEAR || MRX || align=right | 1.3 km || 
|-id=699 bgcolor=#E9E9E9
| 262699 ||  || — || November 18, 2006 || Kitt Peak || Spacewatch || — || align=right | 2.1 km || 
|-id=700 bgcolor=#E9E9E9
| 262700 ||  || — || November 27, 2006 || Mount Lemmon || Mount Lemmon Survey || HOF || align=right | 3.4 km || 
|}

262701–262800 

|-bgcolor=#E9E9E9
| 262701 ||  || — || November 16, 2006 || Kitt Peak || Spacewatch || — || align=right | 1.3 km || 
|-id=702 bgcolor=#E9E9E9
| 262702 || 2006 XS || — || December 10, 2006 || Pla D'Arguines || R. Ferrando || — || align=right | 1.2 km || 
|-id=703 bgcolor=#fefefe
| 262703 ||  || — || December 12, 2006 || Marly || P. Kocher || — || align=right | 1.3 km || 
|-id=704 bgcolor=#E9E9E9
| 262704 ||  || — || December 14, 2006 || Wildberg || R. Apitzsch || — || align=right | 1.9 km || 
|-id=705 bgcolor=#fefefe
| 262705 Vosne-Romanée ||  ||  || December 14, 2006 || Vicques || M. Ory || NYS || align=right data-sort-value="0.91" | 910 m || 
|-id=706 bgcolor=#E9E9E9
| 262706 ||  || — || December 13, 2006 || 7300 || W. K. Y. Yeung || — || align=right | 1.4 km || 
|-id=707 bgcolor=#E9E9E9
| 262707 ||  || — || December 1, 2006 || Mount Lemmon || Mount Lemmon Survey || — || align=right | 2.0 km || 
|-id=708 bgcolor=#fefefe
| 262708 ||  || — || December 9, 2006 || Palomar || NEAT || — || align=right | 1.4 km || 
|-id=709 bgcolor=#E9E9E9
| 262709 ||  || — || December 9, 2006 || Kitt Peak || Spacewatch || — || align=right | 1.2 km || 
|-id=710 bgcolor=#E9E9E9
| 262710 ||  || — || December 9, 2006 || Kitt Peak || Spacewatch || — || align=right | 3.7 km || 
|-id=711 bgcolor=#d6d6d6
| 262711 ||  || — || December 9, 2006 || Palomar || NEAT || — || align=right | 3.9 km || 
|-id=712 bgcolor=#E9E9E9
| 262712 ||  || — || December 9, 2006 || Kitt Peak || Spacewatch || — || align=right | 2.7 km || 
|-id=713 bgcolor=#E9E9E9
| 262713 ||  || — || December 10, 2006 || Kitt Peak || Spacewatch || — || align=right | 3.2 km || 
|-id=714 bgcolor=#d6d6d6
| 262714 ||  || — || December 10, 2006 || Kitt Peak || Spacewatch || NAE || align=right | 3.4 km || 
|-id=715 bgcolor=#E9E9E9
| 262715 ||  || — || December 10, 2006 || Kitt Peak || Spacewatch || — || align=right | 1.5 km || 
|-id=716 bgcolor=#d6d6d6
| 262716 ||  || — || December 10, 2006 || Kitt Peak || Spacewatch || — || align=right | 3.8 km || 
|-id=717 bgcolor=#E9E9E9
| 262717 ||  || — || December 10, 2006 || Kitt Peak || Spacewatch || — || align=right | 2.2 km || 
|-id=718 bgcolor=#d6d6d6
| 262718 ||  || — || December 11, 2006 || Kitt Peak || Spacewatch || CHA || align=right | 3.1 km || 
|-id=719 bgcolor=#d6d6d6
| 262719 ||  || — || December 11, 2006 || Kitt Peak || Spacewatch || — || align=right | 4.5 km || 
|-id=720 bgcolor=#fefefe
| 262720 ||  || — || December 11, 2006 || Catalina || CSS || V || align=right data-sort-value="0.92" | 920 m || 
|-id=721 bgcolor=#E9E9E9
| 262721 ||  || — || December 12, 2006 || Kitt Peak || Spacewatch || — || align=right | 1.6 km || 
|-id=722 bgcolor=#fefefe
| 262722 ||  || — || December 12, 2006 || Kitt Peak || Spacewatch || — || align=right data-sort-value="0.99" | 990 m || 
|-id=723 bgcolor=#E9E9E9
| 262723 ||  || — || December 12, 2006 || Mount Lemmon || Mount Lemmon Survey || MRX || align=right | 1.1 km || 
|-id=724 bgcolor=#fefefe
| 262724 ||  || — || December 13, 2006 || Catalina || CSS || MAS || align=right data-sort-value="0.94" | 940 m || 
|-id=725 bgcolor=#E9E9E9
| 262725 ||  || — || December 13, 2006 || Socorro || LINEAR || — || align=right | 1.5 km || 
|-id=726 bgcolor=#d6d6d6
| 262726 ||  || — || December 13, 2006 || Mount Lemmon || Mount Lemmon Survey || HYG || align=right | 5.3 km || 
|-id=727 bgcolor=#d6d6d6
| 262727 ||  || — || December 9, 2006 || Kitt Peak || Spacewatch || — || align=right | 2.8 km || 
|-id=728 bgcolor=#E9E9E9
| 262728 ||  || — || December 11, 2006 || Kitt Peak || Spacewatch || — || align=right | 1.2 km || 
|-id=729 bgcolor=#fefefe
| 262729 ||  || — || December 11, 2006 || Kitt Peak || Spacewatch || — || align=right | 1.4 km || 
|-id=730 bgcolor=#d6d6d6
| 262730 ||  || — || December 11, 2006 || Kitt Peak || Spacewatch || EOS || align=right | 2.4 km || 
|-id=731 bgcolor=#E9E9E9
| 262731 ||  || — || December 11, 2006 || Kitt Peak || Spacewatch || GEF || align=right | 1.7 km || 
|-id=732 bgcolor=#E9E9E9
| 262732 ||  || — || December 11, 2006 || Kitt Peak || Spacewatch || NEM || align=right | 2.5 km || 
|-id=733 bgcolor=#E9E9E9
| 262733 ||  || — || December 11, 2006 || Kitt Peak || Spacewatch || — || align=right | 1.5 km || 
|-id=734 bgcolor=#E9E9E9
| 262734 ||  || — || December 12, 2006 || Kitt Peak || Spacewatch || — || align=right | 1.4 km || 
|-id=735 bgcolor=#E9E9E9
| 262735 ||  || — || December 12, 2006 || Kitt Peak || Spacewatch || — || align=right | 1.5 km || 
|-id=736 bgcolor=#E9E9E9
| 262736 ||  || — || December 12, 2006 || Mount Lemmon || Mount Lemmon Survey || — || align=right | 1.6 km || 
|-id=737 bgcolor=#E9E9E9
| 262737 ||  || — || December 13, 2006 || Kitt Peak || Spacewatch || — || align=right | 1.6 km || 
|-id=738 bgcolor=#d6d6d6
| 262738 ||  || — || December 13, 2006 || Kitt Peak || Spacewatch || — || align=right | 3.3 km || 
|-id=739 bgcolor=#d6d6d6
| 262739 ||  || — || December 13, 2006 || Catalina || CSS || — || align=right | 4.7 km || 
|-id=740 bgcolor=#E9E9E9
| 262740 ||  || — || December 13, 2006 || Socorro || LINEAR || GEF || align=right | 1.8 km || 
|-id=741 bgcolor=#E9E9E9
| 262741 ||  || — || December 13, 2006 || Mount Lemmon || Mount Lemmon Survey || INO || align=right | 1.8 km || 
|-id=742 bgcolor=#E9E9E9
| 262742 ||  || — || December 13, 2006 || Mount Lemmon || Mount Lemmon Survey || AGN || align=right | 1.5 km || 
|-id=743 bgcolor=#E9E9E9
| 262743 ||  || — || December 13, 2006 || Mount Lemmon || Mount Lemmon Survey || NEM || align=right | 2.4 km || 
|-id=744 bgcolor=#d6d6d6
| 262744 ||  || — || December 13, 2006 || Mount Lemmon || Mount Lemmon Survey || — || align=right | 3.7 km || 
|-id=745 bgcolor=#E9E9E9
| 262745 ||  || — || December 13, 2006 || Mount Lemmon || Mount Lemmon Survey || — || align=right | 2.6 km || 
|-id=746 bgcolor=#E9E9E9
| 262746 ||  || — || December 13, 2006 || Kitt Peak || Spacewatch || — || align=right | 2.8 km || 
|-id=747 bgcolor=#E9E9E9
| 262747 ||  || — || December 14, 2006 || Kitt Peak || Spacewatch || — || align=right | 1.8 km || 
|-id=748 bgcolor=#fefefe
| 262748 ||  || — || December 15, 2006 || Socorro || LINEAR || — || align=right | 2.2 km || 
|-id=749 bgcolor=#E9E9E9
| 262749 ||  || — || December 15, 2006 || Mount Lemmon || Mount Lemmon Survey || EUN || align=right | 1.2 km || 
|-id=750 bgcolor=#E9E9E9
| 262750 ||  || — || December 13, 2006 || Mount Lemmon || Mount Lemmon Survey || — || align=right | 3.7 km || 
|-id=751 bgcolor=#d6d6d6
| 262751 ||  || — || December 13, 2006 || Mount Lemmon || Mount Lemmon Survey || — || align=right | 2.3 km || 
|-id=752 bgcolor=#E9E9E9
| 262752 ||  || — || December 13, 2006 || Mount Lemmon || Mount Lemmon Survey || — || align=right | 1.4 km || 
|-id=753 bgcolor=#E9E9E9
| 262753 ||  || — || December 14, 2006 || Mount Lemmon || Mount Lemmon Survey || DOR || align=right | 3.1 km || 
|-id=754 bgcolor=#E9E9E9
| 262754 ||  || — || December 14, 2006 || Socorro || LINEAR || EUN || align=right | 1.7 km || 
|-id=755 bgcolor=#E9E9E9
| 262755 ||  || — || December 14, 2006 || Kitt Peak || Spacewatch || XIZ || align=right | 1.5 km || 
|-id=756 bgcolor=#E9E9E9
| 262756 ||  || — || December 14, 2006 || Kitt Peak || Spacewatch || PAD || align=right | 1.9 km || 
|-id=757 bgcolor=#E9E9E9
| 262757 ||  || — || December 14, 2006 || Kitt Peak || Spacewatch || — || align=right | 2.1 km || 
|-id=758 bgcolor=#d6d6d6
| 262758 ||  || — || December 15, 2006 || Socorro || LINEAR || EOS || align=right | 3.2 km || 
|-id=759 bgcolor=#fefefe
| 262759 ||  || — || December 15, 2006 || Mount Lemmon || Mount Lemmon Survey || MAS || align=right | 1.1 km || 
|-id=760 bgcolor=#d6d6d6
| 262760 ||  || — || December 15, 2006 || Kitt Peak || Spacewatch || — || align=right | 4.1 km || 
|-id=761 bgcolor=#E9E9E9
| 262761 ||  || — || December 12, 2006 || Palomar || NEAT || — || align=right | 2.1 km || 
|-id=762 bgcolor=#E9E9E9
| 262762 ||  || — || December 12, 2006 || Palomar || NEAT || — || align=right data-sort-value="0.98" | 980 m || 
|-id=763 bgcolor=#E9E9E9
| 262763 ||  || — || December 13, 2006 || Catalina || CSS || BRG || align=right | 2.0 km || 
|-id=764 bgcolor=#d6d6d6
| 262764 ||  || — || December 13, 2006 || Kitt Peak || Spacewatch || HYG || align=right | 2.9 km || 
|-id=765 bgcolor=#d6d6d6
| 262765 ||  || — || December 15, 2006 || Kitt Peak || Spacewatch || TIR || align=right | 4.0 km || 
|-id=766 bgcolor=#E9E9E9
| 262766 ||  || — || December 11, 2006 || Kitt Peak || Spacewatch || — || align=right | 1.7 km || 
|-id=767 bgcolor=#E9E9E9
| 262767 ||  || — || December 15, 2006 || Kitt Peak || Spacewatch || — || align=right | 1.4 km || 
|-id=768 bgcolor=#E9E9E9
| 262768 ||  || — || December 16, 2006 || Kitt Peak || Spacewatch || — || align=right | 1.7 km || 
|-id=769 bgcolor=#E9E9E9
| 262769 ||  || — || December 16, 2006 || Mount Lemmon || Mount Lemmon Survey || — || align=right | 1.5 km || 
|-id=770 bgcolor=#d6d6d6
| 262770 ||  || — || December 16, 2006 || Mount Lemmon || Mount Lemmon Survey || — || align=right | 4.7 km || 
|-id=771 bgcolor=#E9E9E9
| 262771 ||  || — || December 17, 2006 || Mount Lemmon || Mount Lemmon Survey || — || align=right | 1.9 km || 
|-id=772 bgcolor=#E9E9E9
| 262772 ||  || — || December 20, 2006 || Palomar || NEAT || — || align=right | 1.7 km || 
|-id=773 bgcolor=#E9E9E9
| 262773 ||  || — || December 20, 2006 || Palomar || NEAT || EUN || align=right | 2.4 km || 
|-id=774 bgcolor=#fefefe
| 262774 ||  || — || December 20, 2006 || Palomar || NEAT || ERI || align=right | 2.2 km || 
|-id=775 bgcolor=#E9E9E9
| 262775 ||  || — || December 20, 2006 || Mount Lemmon || Mount Lemmon Survey || — || align=right | 1.1 km || 
|-id=776 bgcolor=#fefefe
| 262776 ||  || — || December 22, 2006 || Gnosca || S. Sposetti || MAS || align=right | 1.0 km || 
|-id=777 bgcolor=#E9E9E9
| 262777 ||  || — || December 23, 2006 || Gnosca || S. Sposetti || — || align=right | 3.5 km || 
|-id=778 bgcolor=#d6d6d6
| 262778 ||  || — || December 25, 2006 || Gnosca || S. Sposetti || EOS || align=right | 2.9 km || 
|-id=779 bgcolor=#E9E9E9
| 262779 ||  || — || December 18, 2006 || Socorro || LINEAR || MRX || align=right | 1.2 km || 
|-id=780 bgcolor=#E9E9E9
| 262780 ||  || — || December 23, 2006 || Catalina || CSS || — || align=right | 1.4 km || 
|-id=781 bgcolor=#E9E9E9
| 262781 ||  || — || December 25, 2006 || Jarnac || Jarnac Obs. || — || align=right | 1.9 km || 
|-id=782 bgcolor=#E9E9E9
| 262782 ||  || — || December 22, 2006 || Socorro || LINEAR || — || align=right | 1.3 km || 
|-id=783 bgcolor=#d6d6d6
| 262783 ||  || — || December 23, 2006 || Mount Lemmon || Mount Lemmon Survey || — || align=right | 3.4 km || 
|-id=784 bgcolor=#d6d6d6
| 262784 ||  || — || December 24, 2006 || Kitt Peak || Spacewatch || — || align=right | 5.7 km || 
|-id=785 bgcolor=#E9E9E9
| 262785 ||  || — || December 20, 2006 || Mount Lemmon || Mount Lemmon Survey || — || align=right | 1.2 km || 
|-id=786 bgcolor=#E9E9E9
| 262786 ||  || — || December 21, 2006 || Kitt Peak || Spacewatch || XIZ || align=right | 1.3 km || 
|-id=787 bgcolor=#E9E9E9
| 262787 ||  || — || December 21, 2006 || Kitt Peak || Spacewatch || — || align=right | 2.2 km || 
|-id=788 bgcolor=#d6d6d6
| 262788 ||  || — || December 21, 2006 || Kitt Peak || Spacewatch || — || align=right | 4.7 km || 
|-id=789 bgcolor=#E9E9E9
| 262789 ||  || — || December 21, 2006 || Kitt Peak || Spacewatch || PAD || align=right | 2.0 km || 
|-id=790 bgcolor=#E9E9E9
| 262790 ||  || — || December 21, 2006 || Kitt Peak || Spacewatch || HOF || align=right | 2.8 km || 
|-id=791 bgcolor=#E9E9E9
| 262791 ||  || — || December 21, 2006 || Kitt Peak || Spacewatch || — || align=right | 1.4 km || 
|-id=792 bgcolor=#E9E9E9
| 262792 ||  || — || December 21, 2006 || Kitt Peak || Spacewatch || — || align=right | 1.1 km || 
|-id=793 bgcolor=#E9E9E9
| 262793 ||  || — || December 21, 2006 || Kitt Peak || Spacewatch || — || align=right | 2.0 km || 
|-id=794 bgcolor=#E9E9E9
| 262794 ||  || — || December 22, 2006 || Socorro || LINEAR || — || align=right | 2.0 km || 
|-id=795 bgcolor=#E9E9E9
| 262795 ||  || — || December 24, 2006 || Mount Lemmon || Mount Lemmon Survey || HEN || align=right | 1.1 km || 
|-id=796 bgcolor=#E9E9E9
| 262796 ||  || — || December 21, 2006 || Mount Lemmon || Mount Lemmon Survey || — || align=right | 1.3 km || 
|-id=797 bgcolor=#d6d6d6
| 262797 ||  || — || December 22, 2006 || Socorro || LINEAR || EUP || align=right | 5.0 km || 
|-id=798 bgcolor=#E9E9E9
| 262798 ||  || — || December 22, 2006 || Socorro || LINEAR || — || align=right | 4.1 km || 
|-id=799 bgcolor=#d6d6d6
| 262799 ||  || — || December 21, 2006 || Kitt Peak || M. W. Buie || — || align=right | 2.2 km || 
|-id=800 bgcolor=#E9E9E9
| 262800 ||  || — || December 21, 2006 || Kitt Peak || M. W. Buie || — || align=right | 1.0 km || 
|}

262801–262900 

|-bgcolor=#d6d6d6
| 262801 ||  || — || December 16, 2006 || Kitt Peak || Spacewatch || EOS || align=right | 2.3 km || 
|-id=802 bgcolor=#E9E9E9
| 262802 ||  || — || December 27, 2006 || Mount Lemmon || Mount Lemmon Survey || GEF || align=right | 1.4 km || 
|-id=803 bgcolor=#d6d6d6
| 262803 ||  || — || December 27, 2006 || Mount Lemmon || Mount Lemmon Survey || — || align=right | 5.1 km || 
|-id=804 bgcolor=#E9E9E9
| 262804 ||  || — || December 24, 2006 || Kitt Peak || Spacewatch || WIT || align=right | 1.3 km || 
|-id=805 bgcolor=#E9E9E9
| 262805 ||  || — || December 27, 2006 || Mount Lemmon || Mount Lemmon Survey || — || align=right | 2.0 km || 
|-id=806 bgcolor=#E9E9E9
| 262806 ||  || — || December 27, 2006 || Mount Lemmon || Mount Lemmon Survey || — || align=right | 1.3 km || 
|-id=807 bgcolor=#E9E9E9
| 262807 ||  || — || January 8, 2007 || Mount Lemmon || Mount Lemmon Survey || — || align=right | 1.8 km || 
|-id=808 bgcolor=#E9E9E9
| 262808 ||  || — || January 8, 2007 || Mount Lemmon || Mount Lemmon Survey || AGN || align=right | 1.8 km || 
|-id=809 bgcolor=#E9E9E9
| 262809 ||  || — || January 8, 2007 || Mount Lemmon || Mount Lemmon Survey || — || align=right | 1.8 km || 
|-id=810 bgcolor=#d6d6d6
| 262810 ||  || — || January 8, 2007 || Mount Lemmon || Mount Lemmon Survey || CHA || align=right | 2.6 km || 
|-id=811 bgcolor=#E9E9E9
| 262811 ||  || — || January 9, 2007 || Mount Lemmon || Mount Lemmon Survey || — || align=right | 1.6 km || 
|-id=812 bgcolor=#E9E9E9
| 262812 ||  || — || January 10, 2007 || Nyukasa || Mount Nyukasa Stn. || — || align=right | 2.3 km || 
|-id=813 bgcolor=#d6d6d6
| 262813 ||  || — || January 10, 2007 || Nyukasa || Mount Nyukasa Stn. || — || align=right | 4.3 km || 
|-id=814 bgcolor=#E9E9E9
| 262814 ||  || — || January 8, 2007 || Kitt Peak || Spacewatch || AGN || align=right | 1.5 km || 
|-id=815 bgcolor=#E9E9E9
| 262815 ||  || — || January 8, 2007 || Mount Lemmon || Mount Lemmon Survey || MRX || align=right | 1.6 km || 
|-id=816 bgcolor=#E9E9E9
| 262816 ||  || — || January 10, 2007 || Kitt Peak || Spacewatch || — || align=right | 1.8 km || 
|-id=817 bgcolor=#fefefe
| 262817 ||  || — || January 9, 2007 || Mount Lemmon || Mount Lemmon Survey || V || align=right | 1.2 km || 
|-id=818 bgcolor=#E9E9E9
| 262818 ||  || — || January 13, 2007 || Socorro || LINEAR || — || align=right | 1.3 km || 
|-id=819 bgcolor=#E9E9E9
| 262819 ||  || — || January 15, 2007 || Anderson Mesa || LONEOS || — || align=right | 2.2 km || 
|-id=820 bgcolor=#E9E9E9
| 262820 ||  || — || January 8, 2007 || Catalina || CSS || — || align=right | 1.8 km || 
|-id=821 bgcolor=#E9E9E9
| 262821 ||  || — || January 15, 2007 || Anderson Mesa || LONEOS || — || align=right | 1.8 km || 
|-id=822 bgcolor=#E9E9E9
| 262822 ||  || — || January 15, 2007 || Catalina || CSS || NEM || align=right | 3.6 km || 
|-id=823 bgcolor=#E9E9E9
| 262823 ||  || — || January 15, 2007 || Anderson Mesa || LONEOS || EUN || align=right | 1.7 km || 
|-id=824 bgcolor=#E9E9E9
| 262824 ||  || — || January 10, 2007 || Mount Lemmon || Mount Lemmon Survey || GEF || align=right | 1.5 km || 
|-id=825 bgcolor=#d6d6d6
| 262825 ||  || — || January 10, 2007 || Mount Lemmon || Mount Lemmon Survey || — || align=right | 4.4 km || 
|-id=826 bgcolor=#E9E9E9
| 262826 ||  || — || January 10, 2007 || Mount Lemmon || Mount Lemmon Survey || — || align=right | 3.3 km || 
|-id=827 bgcolor=#E9E9E9
| 262827 ||  || — || January 10, 2007 || Mount Lemmon || Mount Lemmon Survey || — || align=right | 1.2 km || 
|-id=828 bgcolor=#fefefe
| 262828 ||  || — || January 10, 2007 || Mount Lemmon || Mount Lemmon Survey || V || align=right data-sort-value="0.78" | 780 m || 
|-id=829 bgcolor=#E9E9E9
| 262829 ||  || — || January 8, 2007 || Kitt Peak || Spacewatch || — || align=right | 4.2 km || 
|-id=830 bgcolor=#E9E9E9
| 262830 ||  || — || January 10, 2007 || Mount Lemmon || Mount Lemmon Survey || — || align=right | 2.0 km || 
|-id=831 bgcolor=#E9E9E9
| 262831 ||  || — || January 10, 2007 || Mount Lemmon || Mount Lemmon Survey || AGN || align=right | 1.5 km || 
|-id=832 bgcolor=#E9E9E9
| 262832 ||  || — || January 16, 2007 || Socorro || LINEAR || — || align=right | 2.0 km || 
|-id=833 bgcolor=#fefefe
| 262833 ||  || — || January 16, 2007 || Catalina || CSS || — || align=right | 1.4 km || 
|-id=834 bgcolor=#E9E9E9
| 262834 ||  || — || January 16, 2007 || Mount Lemmon || Mount Lemmon Survey || — || align=right | 2.0 km || 
|-id=835 bgcolor=#E9E9E9
| 262835 ||  || — || January 16, 2007 || Catalina || CSS || — || align=right | 1.4 km || 
|-id=836 bgcolor=#E9E9E9
| 262836 ||  || — || January 16, 2007 || Socorro || LINEAR || — || align=right | 1.2 km || 
|-id=837 bgcolor=#E9E9E9
| 262837 ||  || — || January 16, 2007 || Anderson Mesa || LONEOS || — || align=right | 1.5 km || 
|-id=838 bgcolor=#E9E9E9
| 262838 ||  || — || January 16, 2007 || Catalina || CSS || — || align=right | 2.0 km || 
|-id=839 bgcolor=#fefefe
| 262839 ||  || — || January 17, 2007 || Palomar || NEAT || V || align=right data-sort-value="0.92" | 920 m || 
|-id=840 bgcolor=#E9E9E9
| 262840 ||  || — || January 17, 2007 || Catalina || CSS || — || align=right | 1.8 km || 
|-id=841 bgcolor=#E9E9E9
| 262841 ||  || — || January 17, 2007 || Palomar || NEAT || — || align=right | 4.6 km || 
|-id=842 bgcolor=#d6d6d6
| 262842 ||  || — || January 17, 2007 || Palomar || NEAT || — || align=right | 5.3 km || 
|-id=843 bgcolor=#d6d6d6
| 262843 ||  || — || January 16, 2007 || Catalina || CSS || — || align=right | 6.3 km || 
|-id=844 bgcolor=#E9E9E9
| 262844 ||  || — || January 17, 2007 || Kitt Peak || Spacewatch || — || align=right | 2.7 km || 
|-id=845 bgcolor=#E9E9E9
| 262845 ||  || — || January 17, 2007 || Kitt Peak || Spacewatch || — || align=right data-sort-value="0.91" | 910 m || 
|-id=846 bgcolor=#E9E9E9
| 262846 ||  || — || January 17, 2007 || Palomar || NEAT || — || align=right | 1.1 km || 
|-id=847 bgcolor=#d6d6d6
| 262847 ||  || — || January 17, 2007 || Kitt Peak || Spacewatch || — || align=right | 5.7 km || 
|-id=848 bgcolor=#E9E9E9
| 262848 ||  || — || January 17, 2007 || Palomar || NEAT || — || align=right | 1.5 km || 
|-id=849 bgcolor=#E9E9E9
| 262849 ||  || — || January 18, 2007 || Palomar || NEAT || — || align=right | 1.8 km || 
|-id=850 bgcolor=#E9E9E9
| 262850 ||  || — || January 21, 2007 || Socorro || LINEAR || — || align=right | 2.5 km || 
|-id=851 bgcolor=#E9E9E9
| 262851 ||  || — || January 23, 2007 || Anderson Mesa || LONEOS || — || align=right | 1.9 km || 
|-id=852 bgcolor=#E9E9E9
| 262852 ||  || — || January 23, 2007 || Anderson Mesa || LONEOS || — || align=right | 2.6 km || 
|-id=853 bgcolor=#E9E9E9
| 262853 ||  || — || January 23, 2007 || Socorro || LINEAR || — || align=right | 3.2 km || 
|-id=854 bgcolor=#E9E9E9
| 262854 ||  || — || January 25, 2007 || Kitt Peak || Spacewatch || — || align=right | 2.3 km || 
|-id=855 bgcolor=#E9E9E9
| 262855 ||  || — || January 23, 2007 || Socorro || LINEAR || EUN || align=right | 1.7 km || 
|-id=856 bgcolor=#d6d6d6
| 262856 ||  || — || January 24, 2007 || Mount Lemmon || Mount Lemmon Survey || EOS || align=right | 2.8 km || 
|-id=857 bgcolor=#E9E9E9
| 262857 ||  || — || January 24, 2007 || Mount Lemmon || Mount Lemmon Survey || — || align=right | 1.6 km || 
|-id=858 bgcolor=#E9E9E9
| 262858 ||  || — || January 24, 2007 || Mount Lemmon || Mount Lemmon Survey || — || align=right | 1.2 km || 
|-id=859 bgcolor=#E9E9E9
| 262859 ||  || — || January 24, 2007 || Socorro || LINEAR || — || align=right | 1.9 km || 
|-id=860 bgcolor=#E9E9E9
| 262860 ||  || — || January 24, 2007 || Socorro || LINEAR || AGN || align=right | 1.5 km || 
|-id=861 bgcolor=#E9E9E9
| 262861 ||  || — || January 24, 2007 || Catalina || CSS || — || align=right | 3.3 km || 
|-id=862 bgcolor=#fefefe
| 262862 ||  || — || January 24, 2007 || Catalina || CSS || — || align=right | 1.1 km || 
|-id=863 bgcolor=#d6d6d6
| 262863 ||  || — || January 24, 2007 || Kitt Peak || Spacewatch || — || align=right | 3.8 km || 
|-id=864 bgcolor=#d6d6d6
| 262864 ||  || — || January 24, 2007 || Mount Lemmon || Mount Lemmon Survey || — || align=right | 2.4 km || 
|-id=865 bgcolor=#E9E9E9
| 262865 ||  || — || January 24, 2007 || Mount Lemmon || Mount Lemmon Survey || — || align=right | 1.5 km || 
|-id=866 bgcolor=#d6d6d6
| 262866 ||  || — || January 26, 2007 || Kitt Peak || Spacewatch || — || align=right | 3.1 km || 
|-id=867 bgcolor=#E9E9E9
| 262867 ||  || — || January 26, 2007 || Kitt Peak || Spacewatch || — || align=right | 1.7 km || 
|-id=868 bgcolor=#d6d6d6
| 262868 ||  || — || January 26, 2007 || Kitt Peak || Spacewatch || — || align=right | 3.1 km || 
|-id=869 bgcolor=#d6d6d6
| 262869 ||  || — || January 26, 2007 || Kitt Peak || Spacewatch || EOS || align=right | 2.1 km || 
|-id=870 bgcolor=#d6d6d6
| 262870 ||  || — || January 23, 2007 || Socorro || LINEAR || — || align=right | 5.7 km || 
|-id=871 bgcolor=#E9E9E9
| 262871 ||  || — || January 24, 2007 || Kitt Peak || Spacewatch || MAR || align=right | 1.2 km || 
|-id=872 bgcolor=#E9E9E9
| 262872 ||  || — || January 24, 2007 || Catalina || CSS || — || align=right | 1.9 km || 
|-id=873 bgcolor=#E9E9E9
| 262873 ||  || — || January 24, 2007 || Catalina || CSS || — || align=right | 1.2 km || 
|-id=874 bgcolor=#E9E9E9
| 262874 ||  || — || January 24, 2007 || Catalina || CSS || — || align=right | 1.1 km || 
|-id=875 bgcolor=#d6d6d6
| 262875 ||  || — || January 27, 2007 || Mount Lemmon || Mount Lemmon Survey || — || align=right | 2.6 km || 
|-id=876 bgcolor=#E9E9E9
| 262876 Davidlynch ||  ||  || January 21, 2007 || Nogales || J.-C. Merlin || — || align=right | 2.2 km || 
|-id=877 bgcolor=#E9E9E9
| 262877 ||  || — || January 17, 2007 || Kitt Peak || Spacewatch || HOF || align=right | 3.1 km || 
|-id=878 bgcolor=#d6d6d6
| 262878 ||  || — || January 27, 2007 || Mount Lemmon || Mount Lemmon Survey || — || align=right | 2.6 km || 
|-id=879 bgcolor=#d6d6d6
| 262879 ||  || — || January 27, 2007 || Kitt Peak || Spacewatch || — || align=right | 2.8 km || 
|-id=880 bgcolor=#E9E9E9
| 262880 ||  || — || January 17, 2007 || Kitt Peak || Spacewatch || — || align=right | 1.6 km || 
|-id=881 bgcolor=#d6d6d6
| 262881 ||  || — || January 28, 2007 || Mount Lemmon || Mount Lemmon Survey || TEL || align=right | 2.0 km || 
|-id=882 bgcolor=#E9E9E9
| 262882 ||  || — || January 24, 2007 || Catalina || CSS || — || align=right | 4.0 km || 
|-id=883 bgcolor=#d6d6d6
| 262883 ||  || — || February 6, 2007 || Kitt Peak || Spacewatch || KAR || align=right | 1.1 km || 
|-id=884 bgcolor=#d6d6d6
| 262884 ||  || — || February 6, 2007 || Kitt Peak || Spacewatch || — || align=right | 4.1 km || 
|-id=885 bgcolor=#d6d6d6
| 262885 ||  || — || February 7, 2007 || Catalina || CSS || Tj (2.95) || align=right | 5.9 km || 
|-id=886 bgcolor=#d6d6d6
| 262886 ||  || — || February 6, 2007 || Kitt Peak || Spacewatch || — || align=right | 2.6 km || 
|-id=887 bgcolor=#d6d6d6
| 262887 ||  || — || February 6, 2007 || Mount Lemmon || Mount Lemmon Survey || — || align=right | 2.7 km || 
|-id=888 bgcolor=#d6d6d6
| 262888 ||  || — || February 6, 2007 || Lulin || H.-C. Lin, Q.-z. Ye || — || align=right | 3.0 km || 
|-id=889 bgcolor=#d6d6d6
| 262889 ||  || — || February 7, 2007 || Mount Lemmon || Mount Lemmon Survey || — || align=right | 2.9 km || 
|-id=890 bgcolor=#d6d6d6
| 262890 ||  || — || February 8, 2007 || Mount Lemmon || Mount Lemmon Survey || — || align=right | 2.7 km || 
|-id=891 bgcolor=#d6d6d6
| 262891 ||  || — || February 8, 2007 || Mount Lemmon || Mount Lemmon Survey || EMA || align=right | 5.4 km || 
|-id=892 bgcolor=#E9E9E9
| 262892 ||  || — || February 6, 2007 || Palomar || NEAT || — || align=right | 2.7 km || 
|-id=893 bgcolor=#d6d6d6
| 262893 ||  || — || February 6, 2007 || Mount Lemmon || Mount Lemmon Survey || — || align=right | 2.0 km || 
|-id=894 bgcolor=#d6d6d6
| 262894 ||  || — || February 6, 2007 || Palomar || NEAT || — || align=right | 2.9 km || 
|-id=895 bgcolor=#d6d6d6
| 262895 ||  || — || February 6, 2007 || Mount Lemmon || Mount Lemmon Survey || — || align=right | 2.6 km || 
|-id=896 bgcolor=#E9E9E9
| 262896 ||  || — || February 8, 2007 || Kitt Peak || Spacewatch || — || align=right | 1.3 km || 
|-id=897 bgcolor=#d6d6d6
| 262897 ||  || — || February 6, 2007 || Mount Lemmon || Mount Lemmon Survey || — || align=right | 2.7 km || 
|-id=898 bgcolor=#E9E9E9
| 262898 ||  || — || February 6, 2007 || Mount Lemmon || Mount Lemmon Survey || — || align=right | 1.6 km || 
|-id=899 bgcolor=#E9E9E9
| 262899 ||  || — || February 6, 2007 || Mount Lemmon || Mount Lemmon Survey || EUN || align=right | 1.5 km || 
|-id=900 bgcolor=#E9E9E9
| 262900 ||  || — || February 7, 2007 || Mount Lemmon || Mount Lemmon Survey || — || align=right | 1.2 km || 
|}

262901–263000 

|-bgcolor=#E9E9E9
| 262901 ||  || — || February 7, 2007 || Mount Lemmon || Mount Lemmon Survey || — || align=right | 2.6 km || 
|-id=902 bgcolor=#d6d6d6
| 262902 ||  || — || February 8, 2007 || Palomar || NEAT || TEL || align=right | 1.4 km || 
|-id=903 bgcolor=#E9E9E9
| 262903 ||  || — || February 8, 2007 || Palomar || NEAT || EUN || align=right | 2.1 km || 
|-id=904 bgcolor=#d6d6d6
| 262904 ||  || — || February 8, 2007 || Palomar || NEAT || — || align=right | 3.9 km || 
|-id=905 bgcolor=#E9E9E9
| 262905 ||  || — || February 8, 2007 || Palomar || NEAT || — || align=right | 2.9 km || 
|-id=906 bgcolor=#d6d6d6
| 262906 ||  || — || February 8, 2007 || Palomar || NEAT || — || align=right | 4.9 km || 
|-id=907 bgcolor=#E9E9E9
| 262907 ||  || — || February 8, 2007 || Palomar || NEAT || — || align=right | 3.4 km || 
|-id=908 bgcolor=#E9E9E9
| 262908 ||  || — || February 13, 2007 || Catalina || CSS || EUN || align=right | 1.7 km || 
|-id=909 bgcolor=#d6d6d6
| 262909 ||  || — || February 11, 2007 || Cordell-Lorenz || D. T. Durig || — || align=right | 2.8 km || 
|-id=910 bgcolor=#d6d6d6
| 262910 ||  || — || February 15, 2007 || Vicques || M. Ory || — || align=right | 4.6 km || 
|-id=911 bgcolor=#E9E9E9
| 262911 ||  || — || February 9, 2007 || Catalina || CSS || — || align=right | 3.4 km || 
|-id=912 bgcolor=#d6d6d6
| 262912 ||  || — || February 13, 2007 || Mount Lemmon || Mount Lemmon Survey || SHU3:2 || align=right | 7.3 km || 
|-id=913 bgcolor=#d6d6d6
| 262913 ||  || — || February 13, 2007 || Socorro || LINEAR || — || align=right | 3.8 km || 
|-id=914 bgcolor=#E9E9E9
| 262914 ||  || — || February 15, 2007 || Bergisch Gladbach || W. Bickel || — || align=right | 1.4 km || 
|-id=915 bgcolor=#E9E9E9
| 262915 ||  || — || February 10, 2007 || Catalina || CSS || — || align=right | 3.1 km || 
|-id=916 bgcolor=#E9E9E9
| 262916 ||  || — || February 9, 2007 || Catalina || CSS || — || align=right | 2.8 km || 
|-id=917 bgcolor=#E9E9E9
| 262917 ||  || — || February 13, 2007 || Socorro || LINEAR || — || align=right | 2.6 km || 
|-id=918 bgcolor=#fefefe
| 262918 ||  || — || February 10, 2007 || Catalina || CSS || H || align=right data-sort-value="0.61" | 610 m || 
|-id=919 bgcolor=#E9E9E9
| 262919 ||  || — || February 15, 2007 || Great Shefford || P. Birtwhistle || AGN || align=right | 1.3 km || 
|-id=920 bgcolor=#E9E9E9
| 262920 ||  || — || February 8, 2007 || Kitt Peak || Spacewatch || — || align=right | 1.1 km || 
|-id=921 bgcolor=#d6d6d6
| 262921 ||  || — || February 10, 2007 || Mount Lemmon || Mount Lemmon Survey || — || align=right | 2.9 km || 
|-id=922 bgcolor=#E9E9E9
| 262922 ||  || — || February 13, 2007 || Mount Lemmon || Mount Lemmon Survey || — || align=right | 1.9 km || 
|-id=923 bgcolor=#E9E9E9
| 262923 ||  || — || February 16, 2007 || Catalina || CSS || — || align=right | 4.5 km || 
|-id=924 bgcolor=#d6d6d6
| 262924 ||  || — || February 16, 2007 || Mount Lemmon || Mount Lemmon Survey || — || align=right | 3.1 km || 
|-id=925 bgcolor=#E9E9E9
| 262925 ||  || — || February 17, 2007 || Kitt Peak || Spacewatch || — || align=right | 2.5 km || 
|-id=926 bgcolor=#d6d6d6
| 262926 ||  || — || February 16, 2007 || Catalina || CSS || — || align=right | 3.6 km || 
|-id=927 bgcolor=#E9E9E9
| 262927 ||  || — || February 17, 2007 || Kitt Peak || Spacewatch || HOF || align=right | 3.0 km || 
|-id=928 bgcolor=#d6d6d6
| 262928 ||  || — || February 17, 2007 || Kitt Peak || Spacewatch || — || align=right | 2.5 km || 
|-id=929 bgcolor=#E9E9E9
| 262929 ||  || — || February 17, 2007 || Socorro || LINEAR || — || align=right | 2.7 km || 
|-id=930 bgcolor=#d6d6d6
| 262930 ||  || — || February 16, 2007 || Palomar || NEAT || — || align=right | 4.3 km || 
|-id=931 bgcolor=#E9E9E9
| 262931 ||  || — || February 16, 2007 || Catalina || CSS || — || align=right | 2.9 km || 
|-id=932 bgcolor=#d6d6d6
| 262932 ||  || — || February 17, 2007 || Kitt Peak || Spacewatch || KOR || align=right | 1.6 km || 
|-id=933 bgcolor=#d6d6d6
| 262933 ||  || — || February 17, 2007 || Kitt Peak || Spacewatch || — || align=right | 3.8 km || 
|-id=934 bgcolor=#d6d6d6
| 262934 ||  || — || February 17, 2007 || Kitt Peak || Spacewatch || — || align=right | 2.5 km || 
|-id=935 bgcolor=#E9E9E9
| 262935 ||  || — || February 17, 2007 || Kitt Peak || Spacewatch || — || align=right | 1.5 km || 
|-id=936 bgcolor=#d6d6d6
| 262936 ||  || — || February 17, 2007 || Kitt Peak || Spacewatch || THM || align=right | 3.0 km || 
|-id=937 bgcolor=#d6d6d6
| 262937 ||  || — || February 17, 2007 || Kitt Peak || Spacewatch || KOR || align=right | 1.4 km || 
|-id=938 bgcolor=#d6d6d6
| 262938 ||  || — || February 17, 2007 || Kitt Peak || Spacewatch || — || align=right | 4.0 km || 
|-id=939 bgcolor=#E9E9E9
| 262939 ||  || — || February 17, 2007 || Kitt Peak || Spacewatch || PAD || align=right | 2.2 km || 
|-id=940 bgcolor=#d6d6d6
| 262940 ||  || — || February 17, 2007 || Kitt Peak || Spacewatch || — || align=right | 3.9 km || 
|-id=941 bgcolor=#d6d6d6
| 262941 ||  || — || February 17, 2007 || Kitt Peak || Spacewatch || — || align=right | 3.5 km || 
|-id=942 bgcolor=#d6d6d6
| 262942 ||  || — || February 17, 2007 || Kitt Peak || Spacewatch || KOR || align=right | 1.7 km || 
|-id=943 bgcolor=#d6d6d6
| 262943 ||  || — || February 17, 2007 || Kitt Peak || Spacewatch || — || align=right | 4.3 km || 
|-id=944 bgcolor=#d6d6d6
| 262944 ||  || — || February 17, 2007 || Kitt Peak || Spacewatch || — || align=right | 2.8 km || 
|-id=945 bgcolor=#E9E9E9
| 262945 ||  || — || February 16, 2007 || Mount Lemmon || Mount Lemmon Survey || AGN || align=right | 1.9 km || 
|-id=946 bgcolor=#d6d6d6
| 262946 ||  || — || February 17, 2007 || Mount Lemmon || Mount Lemmon Survey || — || align=right | 3.1 km || 
|-id=947 bgcolor=#d6d6d6
| 262947 ||  || — || February 21, 2007 || Kitt Peak || Spacewatch || — || align=right | 3.9 km || 
|-id=948 bgcolor=#d6d6d6
| 262948 ||  || — || February 21, 2007 || Mount Lemmon || Mount Lemmon Survey || — || align=right | 3.4 km || 
|-id=949 bgcolor=#d6d6d6
| 262949 ||  || — || February 17, 2007 || Kitt Peak || Spacewatch || URS || align=right | 4.9 km || 
|-id=950 bgcolor=#E9E9E9
| 262950 ||  || — || February 19, 2007 || Kitt Peak || Spacewatch || — || align=right | 1.4 km || 
|-id=951 bgcolor=#d6d6d6
| 262951 ||  || — || February 21, 2007 || Kitt Peak || Spacewatch || KOR || align=right | 1.6 km || 
|-id=952 bgcolor=#E9E9E9
| 262952 ||  || — || February 23, 2007 || Catalina || CSS || — || align=right | 2.9 km || 
|-id=953 bgcolor=#d6d6d6
| 262953 ||  || — || February 21, 2007 || Kitt Peak || Spacewatch || — || align=right | 3.0 km || 
|-id=954 bgcolor=#E9E9E9
| 262954 ||  || — || February 21, 2007 || Kitt Peak || Spacewatch || — || align=right | 1.8 km || 
|-id=955 bgcolor=#d6d6d6
| 262955 ||  || — || February 21, 2007 || Kitt Peak || Spacewatch || — || align=right | 3.0 km || 
|-id=956 bgcolor=#E9E9E9
| 262956 ||  || — || February 22, 2007 || Catalina || CSS || — || align=right | 1.7 km || 
|-id=957 bgcolor=#d6d6d6
| 262957 ||  || — || February 22, 2007 || Kitt Peak || Spacewatch || — || align=right | 3.9 km || 
|-id=958 bgcolor=#E9E9E9
| 262958 ||  || — || February 23, 2007 || Catalina || CSS || — || align=right | 2.8 km || 
|-id=959 bgcolor=#E9E9E9
| 262959 ||  || — || February 22, 2007 || Calvin-Rehoboth || Calvin–Rehoboth Obs. || — || align=right | 2.4 km || 
|-id=960 bgcolor=#E9E9E9
| 262960 ||  || — || February 23, 2007 || Kitt Peak || Spacewatch || — || align=right | 1.4 km || 
|-id=961 bgcolor=#E9E9E9
| 262961 ||  || — || February 23, 2007 || Kitt Peak || Spacewatch || — || align=right | 1.7 km || 
|-id=962 bgcolor=#d6d6d6
| 262962 ||  || — || February 23, 2007 || Mount Lemmon || Mount Lemmon Survey || KOR || align=right | 2.1 km || 
|-id=963 bgcolor=#E9E9E9
| 262963 ||  || — || February 23, 2007 || Kitt Peak || Spacewatch || — || align=right | 2.0 km || 
|-id=964 bgcolor=#d6d6d6
| 262964 ||  || — || February 23, 2007 || Mount Lemmon || Mount Lemmon Survey || — || align=right | 3.7 km || 
|-id=965 bgcolor=#d6d6d6
| 262965 ||  || — || February 25, 2007 || Mount Lemmon || Mount Lemmon Survey || EMA || align=right | 4.6 km || 
|-id=966 bgcolor=#d6d6d6
| 262966 ||  || — || February 26, 2007 || Catalina || CSS || MEL || align=right | 6.8 km || 
|-id=967 bgcolor=#d6d6d6
| 262967 ||  || — || February 17, 2007 || Kitt Peak || Spacewatch || — || align=right | 3.6 km || 
|-id=968 bgcolor=#E9E9E9
| 262968 ||  || — || February 21, 2007 || Mount Lemmon || Mount Lemmon Survey || — || align=right | 2.4 km || 
|-id=969 bgcolor=#d6d6d6
| 262969 ||  || — || February 16, 2007 || Catalina || CSS || — || align=right | 4.8 km || 
|-id=970 bgcolor=#E9E9E9
| 262970 ||  || — || March 6, 2007 || Palomar || NEAT || — || align=right | 3.2 km || 
|-id=971 bgcolor=#d6d6d6
| 262971 ||  || — || March 9, 2007 || Mount Lemmon || Mount Lemmon Survey || EOS || align=right | 2.0 km || 
|-id=972 bgcolor=#E9E9E9
| 262972 Petermansfield ||  ||  || March 9, 2007 || Vallemare di Borbona || V. S. Casulli || — || align=right | 2.2 km || 
|-id=973 bgcolor=#d6d6d6
| 262973 ||  || — || March 9, 2007 || Kitt Peak || Spacewatch || — || align=right | 3.2 km || 
|-id=974 bgcolor=#d6d6d6
| 262974 ||  || — || March 9, 2007 || Palomar || NEAT || — || align=right | 3.9 km || 
|-id=975 bgcolor=#d6d6d6
| 262975 ||  || — || March 9, 2007 || Palomar || NEAT || — || align=right | 5.1 km || 
|-id=976 bgcolor=#d6d6d6
| 262976 ||  || — || March 9, 2007 || Kitt Peak || Spacewatch || — || align=right | 3.3 km || 
|-id=977 bgcolor=#d6d6d6
| 262977 ||  || — || March 9, 2007 || Mount Lemmon || Mount Lemmon Survey || EOS || align=right | 2.4 km || 
|-id=978 bgcolor=#E9E9E9
| 262978 ||  || — || March 10, 2007 || Mount Lemmon || Mount Lemmon Survey || — || align=right | 2.7 km || 
|-id=979 bgcolor=#d6d6d6
| 262979 ||  || — || March 10, 2007 || Mount Lemmon || Mount Lemmon Survey || KOR || align=right | 2.1 km || 
|-id=980 bgcolor=#d6d6d6
| 262980 ||  || — || March 10, 2007 || Mount Lemmon || Mount Lemmon Survey || — || align=right | 2.9 km || 
|-id=981 bgcolor=#d6d6d6
| 262981 ||  || — || March 9, 2007 || Palomar || NEAT || — || align=right | 6.1 km || 
|-id=982 bgcolor=#d6d6d6
| 262982 ||  || — || March 10, 2007 || Kitt Peak || Spacewatch || — || align=right | 3.4 km || 
|-id=983 bgcolor=#d6d6d6
| 262983 ||  || — || March 9, 2007 || Kitt Peak || Spacewatch || — || align=right | 3.6 km || 
|-id=984 bgcolor=#E9E9E9
| 262984 ||  || — || March 9, 2007 || Kitt Peak || Spacewatch || — || align=right | 2.0 km || 
|-id=985 bgcolor=#d6d6d6
| 262985 ||  || — || March 9, 2007 || Mount Lemmon || Mount Lemmon Survey || — || align=right | 3.2 km || 
|-id=986 bgcolor=#d6d6d6
| 262986 ||  || — || March 9, 2007 || Kitt Peak || Spacewatch || — || align=right | 3.0 km || 
|-id=987 bgcolor=#d6d6d6
| 262987 ||  || — || March 11, 2007 || Kitt Peak || Spacewatch || — || align=right | 3.4 km || 
|-id=988 bgcolor=#d6d6d6
| 262988 ||  || — || March 10, 2007 || Kitt Peak || Spacewatch || — || align=right | 3.5 km || 
|-id=989 bgcolor=#d6d6d6
| 262989 ||  || — || March 10, 2007 || Kitt Peak || Spacewatch || KAR || align=right | 1.5 km || 
|-id=990 bgcolor=#E9E9E9
| 262990 ||  || — || March 11, 2007 || Kitt Peak || Spacewatch || — || align=right | 2.6 km || 
|-id=991 bgcolor=#E9E9E9
| 262991 ||  || — || March 12, 2007 || Kitt Peak || Spacewatch || — || align=right | 2.4 km || 
|-id=992 bgcolor=#d6d6d6
| 262992 ||  || — || March 9, 2007 || Mount Lemmon || Mount Lemmon Survey || — || align=right | 3.3 km || 
|-id=993 bgcolor=#d6d6d6
| 262993 ||  || — || March 9, 2007 || Mount Lemmon || Mount Lemmon Survey || KOR || align=right | 1.6 km || 
|-id=994 bgcolor=#E9E9E9
| 262994 ||  || — || March 10, 2007 || Kitt Peak || Spacewatch || — || align=right | 2.5 km || 
|-id=995 bgcolor=#d6d6d6
| 262995 ||  || — || March 11, 2007 || Kitt Peak || Spacewatch || — || align=right | 5.2 km || 
|-id=996 bgcolor=#d6d6d6
| 262996 ||  || — || March 11, 2007 || Kitt Peak || Spacewatch || — || align=right | 3.5 km || 
|-id=997 bgcolor=#d6d6d6
| 262997 ||  || — || March 11, 2007 || Kitt Peak || Spacewatch || — || align=right | 3.7 km || 
|-id=998 bgcolor=#d6d6d6
| 262998 ||  || — || March 11, 2007 || Anderson Mesa || LONEOS || 628 || align=right | 3.0 km || 
|-id=999 bgcolor=#E9E9E9
| 262999 ||  || — || March 11, 2007 || Kitt Peak || Spacewatch || — || align=right | 2.4 km || 
|-id=000 bgcolor=#d6d6d6
| 263000 ||  || — || March 11, 2007 || Kitt Peak || Spacewatch || KAR || align=right | 1.5 km || 
|}

References

External links 
 Discovery Circumstances: Numbered Minor Planets (260001)–(265000) (IAU Minor Planet Center)

0262